= List of people by Erdős number =

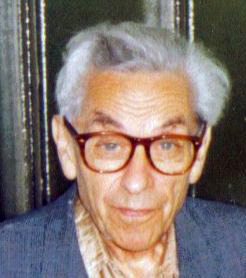
Erdős in 1992

Paul Erdős (1913–1996) was a Hungarian mathematician. He considered mathematics to be a social activity and often collaborated on his papers, having 511 joint authors, many of whom also have their own collaborators. The Erdős number measures the "collaborative distance" between an author and Erdős. Thus, his direct co-authors have Erdős number one, theirs have number two, and so forth. Erdős himself has Erdős number zero.

There are more than 12,500 people with an Erdős number of two. This is a partial list of authors with an Erdős number of three or less. For more complete listings of Erdős numbers, see the databases maintained by the Erdős Number Project or the collaboration distance calculators maintained by the American Mathematical Society and by zbMATH.

== Zero ==
- Paul Erdős

== One ==
=== A ===
- János Aczél
- Ron Aharoni
- Martin Aigner
- Miklós Ajtai
- Leonidas Alaoglu
- Yousef Alavi
- Krishnaswami Alladi
- Noga Alon
- Nesmith Ankeny
- Joseph Arkin
- Boris Aronov
- David Avis

=== B ===
- László Babai
- Frederick Bagemihl
- Leon Bankoff
- Paul T. Bateman
- James Earl Baumgartner
- Mehdi Behzad
- Richard Bellman
- Vitaly Bergelson
- Arie Bialostocki
- Andreas Blass
- Ralph P. Boas Jr
- Béla Bollobás
- John Adrian Bondy
- Joel Lee Brenner
- John Brillhart
- Thomas Craig Brown
- W. G. Brown
- Nicolaas Govert de Bruijn
- R. Creighton Buck
- Stefan Burr
- Steve Butler

=== C ===
- Neil J. Calkin
- Peter Cameron
- Paul A. Catlin
- Gary Chartrand
- Phyllis Chinn
- Sarvadaman Chowla
- Fan Chung
- Kai Lai Chung
- Václav Chvátal
- Charles Colbourn
- John Horton Conway
- Arthur Herbert Copeland
- Imre Csiszár

=== D ===
- Harold Davenport
- Dominique de Caen
- Jean-Marie De Koninck
- Jean-Marc Deshouillers
- Michel Deza
- Persi Diaconis
- Gabriel Andrew Dirac
- Jacques Dixmier
- Yael Dowker
- Underwood Dudley
- Aryeh Dvoretzky

=== E ===
- Andrzej Ehrenfeucht
- György Elekes
- Peter D. T. A. Elliott

=== F ===
- Vance Faber
- Siemion Fajtlowicz
- Ralph Faudree
- László Fejes Tóth
- William Feller
- Peter C. Fishburn
- Géza Fodor
- Aviezri Fraenkel
- Péter Frankl
- Gregory Freiman
- Wolfgang Heinrich Johannes Fuchs
- Zoltán Füredi

=== G ===
- Steven Gaal
- Janos Galambos
- Tibor Gallai
- Fred Galvin
- Joseph E. Gillis
- Leonard Gillman
- Abraham Ginzburg
- Chris Godsil
- Michael Golomb
- Adolph Winkler Goodman
- Basil Gordon
- Ronald J. Gould
- Ronald Graham
- Sidney Graham
- Andrew Granville
- Peter M. Gruber
- Branko Grünbaum
- Hansraj Gupta
- Richard K. Guy
- Michael Guy
- András Gyárfás

=== H ===
- András Hajnal
- Gábor Halász
- Haim Hanani
- Frank Harary
- Stephen T. Hedetniemi
- Zdeněk Hedrlín
- Hans Heilbronn
- Pavol Hell
- Fritz Herzog
- Neil Hindman
- Alan J. Hoffman
- Verner Emil Hoggatt Jr.

=== I ===
- Albert Ingham
- Aleksandar Ivić

=== J ===
- Eri Jabotinsky
- Steve Jackson
- Michael Scott Jacobson
- Svante Janson
- Vojtěch Jarník

=== K ===
- Mark Kac
- Paul Chester Kainen
- Shizuo Kakutani
- Egbert van Kampen
- Irving Kaplansky
- Jovan Karamata
- Ke Zhao
- Paul Kelly
- Péter Kiss
- Murray S. Klamkin
- Maria Klawe
- Daniel Kleitman
- Yoshiharu Kohayakawa
- Jurjen Ferdinand Koksma
- Péter Komjáth
- János Komlós
- Steven G. Krantz
- Michael Krivelevich
- Ewa Kubicka
- Kenneth Kunen

=== L ===
- Jean A. Larson
- Renu C. Laskar
- Joseph Lehner
- William J. LeVeque
- Winnie Li
- Jack van Lint
- Nati Linial
- László Lovász
- Florian Luca
- Tomasz Łuczak

=== M ===
- Robert McEliece
- Brendan McKay
- Menachem Magidor
- Kurt Mahler
- Helmut Maier
- Michael Makkai
- Solomon Marcus
- Giuseppe Melfi
- Eric Charles Milner
- Leon Mirsky
- Hugh Montgomery
- Peter Montgomery
- Shlomo Moran
- Leo Moser
- M. Ram Murty
- V. Kumar Murty

=== N ===
- Melvyn B. Nathanson
- Jaroslav Nešetřil
- Elisha Netanyahu
- Donald J. Newman
- Jean-Louis Nicolas
- Ivan M. Niven

=== O ===
- Andrew Odlyzko
- Ortrud Oellermann
- Cyril Offord
- Patrick O'Neil

=== P ===
- János Pach
- Péter Pál Pálfy
- Torrence Parsons
- George Piranian
- Richard Pollack
- Harry Pollard
- Carl Pomerance
- Lajos Pósa
- Karl Prachar
- David Preiss
- Norman J. Pullman
- George B. Purdy
- László Pyber

=== R ===
- Richard Rado
- Kanakanahalli Ramachandra
- S. B. Rao
- Alfréd Rényi
- Bruce Reznick
- Hans Riesel
- Vojtěch Rödl
- Paul C. Rosenbloom
- Bruce Lee Rothschild
- Cecil C. Rousseau
- Lee Albert Rubel
- Arthur Rubin
- Mary Ellen Rudin
- Imre Z. Ruzsa

=== S ===
- Horst Sachs
- Michael Saks
- Peter Salamon
- Tibor Šalát
- András Sárközy
- Gábor N. Sárközy
- Richard Schelp
- Andrzej Schinzel
- Leonard Schulman
- Sanford Segal
- Wladimir Seidel
- John Selfridge
- Jeffrey Shallit
- Harold S. Shapiro
- Saharon Shelah
- Allen Shields
- Tarlok Nath Shorey
- Ruth Silverman
- Gustavus Simmons
- Miklós Simonovits
- Navin M. Singhi
- Alexander Soifer
- Vera Sós
- Ernst Specker
- Joel Spencer
- Claudia Spiro
- Cameron Leigh Stewart
- Doug Stinson
- Arthur Harold Stone
- Ernst G. Straus
- Mathukumalli V. Subbarao
- Henda Swart
- Mario Szegedy
- Gábor Szegő
- Esther Szekeres
- George Szekeres
- Endre Szemerédi
- Peter Szüsz

=== T ===
- Alfred Tarski
- Alan D. Taylor
- Gérald Tenenbaum
- Prasad V. Tetali
- Carsten Thomassen
- Robert Tijdeman
- Vilmos Totik
- William T. Trotter
- Pál Turán
- W. T. Tutte

=== U ===
- Stanislaw Ulam
- Kazimierz Urbanik

=== V ===
- Bob Vaughan
- Andrew Vázsonyi
- Katalin Vesztergombi
- István Vincze

=== W ===
- Samuel S. Wagstaff Jr.
- Douglas West
- R. M. Wilson
- Robin Wilson
- Peter Winkler
- Nick Wormald

=== Y ===
- Frances Yao

=== Z ===
- Shmuel Zaks
- Stanisław Krystyn Zaremba
- Abraham Ziv

== Two ==
=== A ===
- Karen Aardal
- Shreeram Shankar Abhyankar
- Maya Ackerman
- Sibel Adalı
- Leonard Adleman
- Yehuda Afek
- Pankaj K. Agarwal
- Gordon Agnew
- Zvia Agur
- Dorit Aharonov
- Rudolf Ahlswede
- Jin Akiyama
- Ian F. Akyildiz
- Michael H. Albert
- David Aldous
- W. R. (Red) Alford
- Ahmet Alkan
- Eric Allender
- Brian Alspach
- Andris Ambainis
- Warren Ambrose
- Robert Ammann
- Jane Ammons
- Titu Andreescu
- Cabiria Andreian Cazacu
- Hajnal Andréka
- George Andrews
- Tom M. Apostol
- David Applegate
- Zvi Arad
- Dan Archdeacon
- Richard Friederich Arens
- Sandra Arlinghaus
- Sanjeev Arora
- Emil Artin
- Shiri Artstein
- Tetsuo Asano
- Michael Aschbacher
- Arlene Ash
- Richard Askey
- James Aspnes
- Idris Assani
- Hilda Assiyatun
- Susan Assmann
- Mikhail Atallah
- A. O. L. Atkin
- Michael D. Atkinson
- Hagit Attiya
- Herman Auerbach
- Franz Aurenhammer
- Baruch Awerbuch
- Sheldon Axler

=== B ===
- Eric Bach
- Christine Bachoc
- Joan Bagaria
- David H. Bailey
- Rosemary A. Bailey
- Alan Baker
- Egon Balas
- Ramachandran Balasubramanian
- Bohuslav Balcar
- Pierre Baldi
- Zoltán Tibor Balogh
- Stefan Banach
- Prith Banerjee
- Maya Bar-Hillel
- Dror Bar-Natan
- Albert-László Barabási
- Imre Bárány
- Valentine Bargmann
- Ruth Aaronson Bari
- Naama Barkai
- Martin T. Barlow
- Michael Barnsley
- John D. Barrow
- Tomek Bartoszyński
- Jon Barwise
- Serafim Batzoglou
- Dave Bayer
- Cristina Bazgan
- József Beck
- Edwin F. Beckenbach
- Laurel Beckett
- William Beckner
- L. W. Beineke
- Nuel Belnap
- Serge Belongie
- Valentin Danilovich Belousov
- Alexandra Bellow
- Michael Ben-Or
- Arthur T. Benjamin
- Georgia Benkart
- Claude Berge
- Bonnie Berger
- George Bergman
- Peter Bergmann
- Elwyn Berlekamp
- Nicole Berline
- Leah Berman
- Bruce C. Berndt
- R. Stephen Berry
- Tom Berson
- Valérie Berthé
- Elisa Bertino
- Andrea Bertozzi
- Abram Samoilovitch Besicovitch
- Christine Bessenrodt
- Evert Willem Beth
- Albrecht Beutelspacher
- Károly Bezdek
- Manjul Bhargava
- Vasanti N. Bhat-Nayak
- Therese Biedl
- Louis Billera
- Andrzej Białynicki-Birula
- R. H. Bing
- Kenneth Binmore
- Bryan John Birch
- Garrett Birkhoff
- Z. W. Birnbaum
- Pamela J. Bjorkman
- David Blackwell
- Brian Blank
- Woody Bledsoe
- Vincent Blondel
- Manuel Blum
- Mary L. Boas
- Salomon Bochner
- Mary Ellen Bock
- Hans L. Bodlaender
- Anna Bogomolnaia
- Vladimir Boltyansky
- Enrico Bombieri
- Dan Boneh
- Carl R. de Boor
- Richard Borcherds
- Christian Borgs
- Allan Borodin
- Karol Borsuk
- David Borwein
- Jonathan Borwein
- Peter Borwein
- Jit Bose
- Raj Chandra Bose
- Fernanda Botelho
- Julia Böttcher
- Bernadette Bouchon-Meunier
- Jean Bourgain
- Stephen R. Bourne
- Mireille Bousquet-Mélou
- Jonathan Bowen
- David William Boyd
- Stephen P. Boyd
- Achi Brandt
- Dietrich Braess
- Steven Brams
- Gilles Brassard
- Richard Brauer
- Mya Breitbart
- Charles Brenner
- Richard P. Brent
- David Bressoud
- Keith Briggs
- Graham Brightwell
- Andrei Broder
- Henk Broer
- Andries Brouwer
- Gavin Brown
- Kenneth Brown
- Richard A. Brualdi
- Andrew M. Bruckner
- Janusz Brzozowski
- Maike Buchin
- Johannes Buchmann
- Harry Buhrman
- Joe P. Buhler
- Edward Burger
- Herbert Busemann

=== C ===
- Eugenio Calabi
- Robert Calderbank
- Cristian S. Calude
- M. Elizabeth Cannon
- Charles Cantor
- Sylvain Cappell
- Lennart Carleson
- Gunnar Carlsson
- Leonard Carlitz
- Pierre Cartier
- J. W. S. Cassels
- Yair Censor
- Vint Cerf
- Timothy M. Chan
- K. S. Chandrasekharan
- Subrahmanyan Chandrasekhar
- Bernadette Charron-Bost
- Zoé Chatzidakis
- Jennifer Tour Chayes
- Bernard Chazelle
- Chen Guanrong
- Elliott Ward Cheney Jr.
- Eugenia Cheng
- Otfried Cheong
- Shiing-Shen Chern
- Amanda Chetwynd
- S. A. Choudum
- Maria Chudnovsky
- Zbigniew Ciesielski
- Dustin Clausen
- Richard Cleve
- John H. Coates
- William Gemmell Cochran
- Henri Cohen
- Myra B. Cohen
- Henry Cohn
- Alina Carmen Cojocaru
- Sidney Coleman
- Edward Collingwood
- Cristina Conati
- Marston Conder
- Anne Condon
- Robert Connelly
- Brian Conrey
- William J. Cook
- Keith D. Cooper
- Irving Copi
- Philip Coppens
- Don Coppersmith
- Derek Corneil
- Johannes van der Corput
- Sylvie Corteel
- Collette Coullard
- Thomas M. Cover
- Lenore Cowen
- Harold Scott MacDonald Coxeter
- Richard Crandall
- Claude Crépeau
- Ernest S. Croot III
- Ákos Császár
- Miklós Csörgő
- Sándor Csörgő
- Marianna Csörnyei

=== D ===
- Raissa D’Souza
- Karma Dajani
- Ivan Damgård
- David van Dantzig
- George Dantzig
- Henri Darmon
- Gautam Das
- Sandip Das
- Chantal David
- Kenneth Davidson
- Robyn Dawes
- Donald A. Dawson
- Jaco de Bakker
- Mark de Berg
- Luz de Teresa
- Rina Dechter
- Maria Deijfen
- Ermelinda DeLaViña
- Erik Demaine
- Arthur P. Dempster
- Cyrus Derman
- Nachum Dershowitz
- Claire Deschênes
- Keith Devlin
- Ronald DeVore
- Luc Devroye
- Alexander Dewdney
- Tamal Dey
- Elena Deza
- Brenda L. Dietrich
- Jeff Dinitz
- Michael Dinneen
- Irit Dinur
- Stanislav George Djorgovski
- Hans Dobbertin
- David P. Dobkin
- Carola Doerr
- Danny Dolev
- Shlomi Dolev
- Valéria Neves Domingos Cavalcanti
- Ron Donagi
- David Donoho
- Monroe D. Donsker
- Joseph L. Doob
- Adrien Douady
- Ronald G. Douglas
- Eric van Douwen
- Rod Downey
- Pauline van den Driessche
- Qiang Du
- Alexandra Duel-Hallen
- Tom Duff
- Dwight Duffus
- Michel Duflo
- Andrej Dujella
- Vida Dujmović
- Ioana Dumitriu
- Peter Duren
- Rick Durrett
- Pierre Dusart
- Bernard Dwork
- Cynthia Dwork
- Nira Dyn
- Freeman Dyson

=== E ===
- Peter Eades
- A. Ross Eckler Jr.
- Katsuya Eda
- Herbert Edelsbrunner
- Jack Edmonds
- Michelle Effros
- Bradley Efron
- Tatyana Pavlovna Ehrenfest
- Andrzej Ehrenfeucht
- Tamar Eilam
- Samuel Eilenberg
- Albert Einstein
- David Eisenbud
- Kirsten Eisenträger
- Noam Elkies
- Edith Elkind
- Joanne Elliott
- Jo Ellis-Monaghan
- Per Enflo
- David Eppstein
- Tamás Erdélyi
- Alexandre Eremenko
- Shimon Even
- Hugh Everett III
- Howard Eves

=== F ===
- Ronald Fagin
- Kenneth Falconer
- Jean-Claude Falmagne
- Ky Fan
- Kaitai Fang
- Martin Farach-Colton
- Odile Favaron
- Solomon Feferman
- Charles Fefferman
- Uriel Feige
- Lipót Fejér
- Michael Fekete
- Michal Feldman
- Pedro Felipe Felzenszwalb
- Cristina G. Fernandes
- Daniela Ferrero
- Amos Fiat
- Tadeusz Figiel
- Leah Findlater
- Nathan Fine
- Michael J. Fischer
- Vera Fischer
- Josh Fisher
- Ronald Fisher
- Mary Flahive
- Philippe Flajolet
- Harley Flanders
- Herbert Fleischner
- Wendell Fleming
- Ciprian Foias
- Jon Folkman
- Jean-Marc Fontaine
- Matthew Foreman
- Ferenc Forgó
- Stephanie Forrest
- George E. Forsythe
- M. K. Fort Jr.
- Lance Fortnow
- Lorraine Foster
- Philipp Frank
- Michael Fredman
- Dan Freed
- David A. Freedman
- Michael Freedman
- Chris Freiling
- Juliana Freire
- Peter Freund
- Shmuel Friedland
- John Friedlander
- Harvey Friedman
- Sy Friedman
- Kurt Otto Friedrichs
- Alan M. Frieze
- Monique Frize
- Zdeněk Frolík
- László Fuchs
- D. R. Fulkerson
- Stephen A. Fulling
- William Fulton
- Hillel Furstenberg

=== G ===
- Lisl Gaal
- Dov Gabbay
- Haim Gaifman
- David Gale
- Zvi Galil
- Alexander Gamburd
- Mario Garavaglia
- Martin Gardner
- Michael Garey
- John B. Garnett
- Élisabeth Gassiat
- Joachim von zur Gathen
- Mai Gehrke
- William Gehrlein
- Jane F. Gentleman
- Ralucca Gera
- Ira Gessel
- Ellen Gethner
- Nassif Ghoussoub
- Edgar Gilbert
- Moti Gitik
- Paul Glaister
- Sheldon Glashow
- Michel Goemans
- Edray Herber Goins
- Stanisław Gołąb
- Warren Goldfarb
- Dorian M. Goldfeld
- Oded Goldreich
- Judy Goldsmith
- Martin Goldstern
- Herman Goldstine
- Daniel Goldston
- Shafi Goldwasser
- Eric Goles
- Solomon W. Golomb
- Gene H. Golub
- Marty Golubitsky
- Martin Charles Golumbic
- Ralph E. Gomory
- Amy Ashurst Gooch
- Jacob E. Goodman
- Cameron Gordon
- Mark Goresky
- Henry W. Gould
- Jeremy J. Gray
- Jim Gray
- Ben Green
- Anne Greenbaum
- Curtis Greene
- Robert Everist Greene
- Catherine Greenhill
- Kasper Green Larsen
- Russell Greiner
- Ulf Grenander
- Thomas N. E. Greville
- Robert C. Griffiths
- Thomas L. Griffiths
- Dima Grigoriev
- Geoffrey Grimmett
- Rami Grossberg
- Emil Grosswald
- Martin Grötschel
- Helen G. Grundman
- Christelle Guéret
- Leonidas J. Guibas
- Max Gunzburger
- Yuri Gurevich
- Dan Gusfield
- Gregory Gutin

=== H ===
- Ruth Haas
- Hugo Hadwiger
- Jaroslav Hájek
- Mohammad Hajiaghayi
- György Hajós
- S. L. Hakimi
- Heini Halberstam
- Alfred W. Hales
- Marshall Hall
- Paul Halmos
- Dan Halperin
- Joseph Halpern
- Susanne Hambrusch
- Joel David Hamkins
- Katalin Hangos
- Sariel Har-Peled
- Heiko Harborth
- G. H. Hardy
- Kathryn E. Hare
- Glyn Harman
- Leo Harrington
- Michael Harris
- Pamela E. Harris
- Philip Hartman
- Hiroshi Haruki
- Joel Hass
- Helmut Hasse
- Babak Hassibi
- Johan Håstad
- David Haussler
- Penny Haxell
- Patrick Hayden
- John P. Hayes
- Walter Hayman
- Teresa W. Haynes
- Emilie Virginia Haynsworth
- Sandra Mitchell Hedetniemi
- Neil Heffernan
- Hans-Christian Hege
- Pinar Heggernes
- Katherine Heinrich
- Christine Heitsch
- Harald Helfgott
- John William Helton
- Leon Henkin
- Gabor Herman
- John Hershberger
- Israel Nathan Herstein
- Agnes M. Herzberg
- Silvia Heubach
- Edwin Hewitt
- Graham Higman
- Einar Hille
- Peter Hilton
- David Hinkley
- James William Peter Hirschfeld
- Pascal Hitzler
- Edmund Hlawka
- Dorit S. Hochbaum
- Wilfrid Hodges
- Torsten Hoefler
- Banesh Hoffmann
- Leslie Hogben
- Susan P. Holmes
- Alfred Horn
- Haruo Hosoya
- Roger Evans Howe
- John Mackintosh Howie
- Ehud Hrushovski
- John F. Hughes
- Roger Hui
- Birge Huisgen-Zimmermann
- Eugénie Hunsicker
- Ferran Hurtado
- Joan Hutchinson
- Martin Huxley

=== I ===
- John Iacono
- Oscar H. Ibarra
- Lucian Ilie
- Neil Immerman
- Russell Impagliazzo
- Wilfried Imrich
- Piotr Indyk
- Aubrey William Ingleton
- Kori Inkpen
- Martin Isaacs
- Mourad Ismail
- Kazuo Iwama
- Henryk Iwaniec

=== J ===
- David M. Jackson
- Ralph Duncan James
- Brigitte Jaumard
- Thomas Jech
- David Jerison
- Meyer Jerison
- Mark Jerrum
- Børge Jessen
- Jia Rongqing
- Carl Jockusch
- Charles Royal Johnson
- David S. Johnson
- Ellis L. Johnson
- Norman Johnson
- Norman Lloyd Johnson
- William B. Johnson
- F. Burton Jones
- Peter Jones
- Roger Jones
- Nataša Jonoska
- Bjarni Jónsson
- Dominic Joyce
- Helen Joyce
- Matti Jutila

=== K ===
- Richard Kadison
- Jean-Pierre Kahane
- Jeff Kahn
- Gil Kalai
- Olav Kallenberg
- László Kalmár
- Akihiro Kanamori
- Ravindran Kannan
- Kao Cheng-yan
- Lila Kari
- Anna Karlin
- Samuel Karlin
- Narendra Karmarkar
- Richard M. Karp
- Marek Karpinski
- Gyula O. H. Katona
- Gyula Y. Katona
- Ephraim Katzir
- Yitzhak Katznelson
- Louis Kauffman
- Bruria Kaufman
- Ken-ichi Kawarabayashi
- Alexander S. Kechris
- Klara Kedem
- Howard Jerome Keisler
- Joseph Keller
- Leroy Milton Kelly
- Julia Kempe
- Ken Kennedy
- Michel Kervaire
- Pınar Keskinocak
- Harry Kesten
- Tanya Khovanova
- Jack Kiefer
- Kang-Tae Kim
- Clark Kimberling
- Valerie King
- John Kingman
- William English Kirwan
- Signe Kjelstrup
- John R. Klauder
- Sandi Klavžar
- Victor Klee
- Robert Kleinberg
- Bronisław Knaster
- Konrad Knopp
- Donald Knuth
- William Lawrence Kocay
- Christiane Koch
- Simon B. Kochen
- Waldemar W. Koczkodaj
- Kunihiko Kodaira
- Sven Koenig
- Phokion G. Kolaitis
- János Kollár
- Sergei Konyagin
- Eugene Koonin
- Ádám Korányi
- Jacob Korevaar
- András Kornai
- Thomas William Körner
- S. Rao Kosaraju
- Ronnie Kosloff
- Bertram Kostant
- Samuel Kotz
- Anton Kotzig
- Dexter Kozen
- Dmitri Ilyich Kozlov
- Bryna Kra
- Daniel Kráľ
- Sarit Kraus
- Marc van Kreveld
- Clyde Kruskal
- Joseph Kruskal
- Marek Kuczma
- Harold W. Kuhn
- Markus Kuhn
- Greg Kuperberg
- Krystyna Kuperberg
- Włodzimierz Kuperberg
- Kazimierz Kuratowski
- Věra Kůrková
- Shay Kutten

=== L ===
- Miklós Laczkovich
- Jeffrey Lagarias
- Radha Laha
- Ming-Jun Lai
- Steven Lalley
- Tsit Yuen Lam
- Brian LaMacchia
- Joachim Lambek
- Edmund Landau
- Eric Lander
- Stefan Langerman
- Robert Langlands
- Michael Langston
- Longin Jan Latecki
- Monique Laurent
- Kristin Lauter
- Richard Laver
- Lucien Le Cam
- Imre Leader
- Jon Lee
- Charles Leedham-Green
- Jan van Leeuwen
- Derrick Henry Lehmer
- Emma Lehmer
- F. Thomson Leighton
- Abraham Lempel
- László Lempert
- Arjen Lenstra
- Hendrik Lenstra
- Jan Karel Lenstra
- Hanfried Lenz
- Nancy Leveson
- Leonid Levin
- Raphael David Levine
- Norman Levinson
- Donald John Lewis
- Paul Leyland
- Yingshu Li
- André Lichnerowicz
- Stephen Lichtenbaum
- Katrina Ligett
- Elliott H. Lieb
- Karl Lieberherr
- Thomas M. Liggett
- Joram Lindenstrauss
- Yuri Linnik
- Jacques-Louis Lions
- Richard Lipton
- Barbara Liskov
- John Little
- John Edensor Littlewood
- Andy Liu
- Chung Laung Liu
- Peter A. Loeb
- Ling Long
- Charles Loewner
- Benjamin F. Logan
- Darrell Long
- Judith Q. Longyear
- Lee Lorch
- Paola Loreti
- Catherine A. Lozupone
- Jonathan Lubin
- Anna Lubiw
- Alexander Lubotzky
- Michael Luby
- R. Duncan Luce
- Edith Hirsch Luchins
- Malwina Łuczak
- Monika Ludwig
- Eugene M. Luks
- Carsten Lund
- Joaquin Mazdak Luttinger
- Roger Lyndon

=== M ===
- Kevin McCurley
- Ian G. Macdonald
- Eugene McDonnell
- Joanna McGrenere
- Angus Macintyre
- Sheila Scott Macintyre
- David J. C. MacKay
- John McKay
- Henry McKean
- George Mackey
- Lester Mackey
- Richard McKelvey
- Raymond McLenaghan
- Jeanette McLeod
- Peter McMullen
- Dugald Macpherson
- Jessie MacWilliams
- Roger Maddux
- Thomas L. Magnanti
- Dorothy Maharam
- Ebadollah S. Mahmoodian
- Shahn Majid
- Kira Makarova
- Jitendra Malik
- Dahlia Malkhi
- Maryanthe Malliaris
- Paul Malliavin
- Claudia Malvenuto
- Udi Manber
- Henry Mann
- Heikki Mannila
- Renata Mansini
- Adam Marcus
- Edward Marczewski
- Harry Markowitz
- Alison Marr
- Robert Marshak
- Donald A. Martin
- Gaven Martin
- Anders Martin-Löf
- Katalin Marton
- Dragan Marušič
- Eric Maskin
- David Masser
- James Massey
- William A. Massey
- Claire Mathieu
- Yossi Matias
- Yuri Matiyasevich
- Jiří Matoušek
- Barry Mazur
- Peter Mazur
- Stanisław Mazur
- Victor Mazurov
- Catherine Meadows
- Elizabeth Meckes
- Nimrod Megiddo
- Kurt Mehlhorn
- Nicholas Metropolis
- Albert R. Meyer
- Yves Meyer
- Paul G. Mezey
- Ernest Michael
- Jan Mikusiński
- Olgica Milenkovic
- J. C. P. Miller
- Steven J. Miller
- Victor S. Miller
- Vitali Milman
- Tova Milo
- Michał Misiurewicz
- Joseph S. B. Mitchell
- Michael Mitzenmacher
- Karyn Moffat
- Bojan Mohar
- Joanne Moldenhauer
- Cristopher Moore
- Bernard Moret
- Louis J. Mordell
- Anne C. Morel
- Carlos J. Moreno
- Frank Morgan
- Dana Moshkovitz
- Frederick Mosteller
- Andrzej Mostowski
- Rajeev Motwani
- Theodore Motzkin
- David Mount
- Jennifer Mueller
- Alec Muffett
- Rahul Mukerjee
- Colm Mulcahy
- David Mumford
- J. Ian Munro
- Klaus-Robert Müller
- Jan Mycielski
- Kieka Mynhardt
- Wendy Myrvold
- Lawrence A. Mysak

=== N ===
- David Naccache
- Isaac Namioka
- Assaf Naor
- Joseph Seffi Naor
- Moni Naor
- Crispin Nash-Williams
- Radford M. Neal
- Evelyn Nelson
- Evi Nemeth
- George Nemhauser
- Yuri Valentinovich Nesterenko
- Nathan Netanyahu
- Nancy Neudauer
- Bernhard Neumann
- Peter M. Neumann
- Víctor Neumann-Lara
- Charles M. Newman
- Miron Nicolescu
- Rolf Niedermeier
- Harald Niederreiter
- Noam Nisan
- Abraham Nitzan
- Simon P. Norton
- Isabella Novik
- Ruth Nussinov

=== O ===
- Ryan O'Donnell
- Frédérique Oggier
- Sofia Olhede
- Jim K. Omura
- Mary Jo Ondrechen
- Elizabeth O'Neil
- Ken Ono
- Paul van Oorschot
- Donald Samuel Ornstein
- Leonard Ornstein
- Joseph O'Rourke
- Patrice Ossona de Mendez
- Deryk Osthus
- Rafail Ostrovsky
- Alexander Ostrowski
- James Oxley

=== P ===
- Lior Pachter
- Igor Pak
- Ilona Palásti
- Vladimír Palko
- Rohit Parikh
- Jeff Paris
- Harold R. Parks
- Michal Parnas
- Jonathan Partington
- Oren Patashnik
- Mike Paterson
- Raj Pathria
- Gheorghe Păun
- Jean Pedersen
- Heinz-Otto Peitgen
- Aleksander Pełczyński
- David Peleg
- Magda Peligrad
- Peng Tsu Ann
- Yuval Peres
- Hazel Perfect
- Micha Perles
- Ed Perkins
- Bernadette Perrin-Riou
- Charles S. Peskin
- Erez Petrank
- Robert Phelps
- Cynthia A. Phillips
- Christine Piatko
- Subbayya Sivasankaranarayana Pillai
- János Pintz
- Nick Pippenger
- Tomaž Pisanski
- Gilles Pisier
- Toniann Pitassi
- David Plaisted
- Vera Pless
- Michael D. Plummer
- Amir Pnueli
- Henry O. Pollak
- George Pólya
- Irith Pomeranz
- Christian Pommerenke
- Bjorn Poonen
- Alfred van der Poorten
- Cristian Dumitru Popescu
- Victoria Powers
- Cheryl Praeger
- Vaughan Pratt
- Franco P. Preparata
- Ariel D. Procaccia
- Gordon Preston
- Calton Pu
- William R. Pulleyblank

=== Q ===
- Jean-Jacques Quisquater

=== R ===
- Michael O. Rabin
- Charles Rackoff
- Charles Radin
- Stanisław Radziszowski
- Adrian Raftery
- Stefan Ralescu
- Kavita Ramanan
- K. G. Ramanathan
- Olivier Ramaré
- Dana Randall
- C. R. Rao
- Sofya Raskhodnikova
- Steen Rasmussen
- Michel Raynaud
- Dijen K. Ray-Chaudhuri
- Alexander Razborov
- Ronald C. Read
- László Rédei
- Raymond Redheffer
- Bruce Reed
- Irving S. Reed
- Oded Regev
- Eva Regnier
- K. B. Reid
- Gesine Reinert
- Edward Reingold
- Omer Reingold
- Jennifer Rexford
- Dana S. Richards
- Frigyes Riesz
- John Rigby
- Gerhard Ringel
- Alexander Rinnooy Kan
- John Riordan
- Jorma Rissanen
- Ivan Rival
- Ron Rivest
- Herbert Robbins
- Fred S. Roberts
- Stephen E. Robertson
- Abraham Robinson
- Burton Rodin
- Judith Roitman
- Barbara Rokowska
- Dana Ron
- Colva Roney-Dougal
- Frances A. Rosamond
- Bill Roscoe
- Jonathan Rosenberg
- Azriel Rosenfeld
- Gian-Carlo Rota
- Klaus Roth
- Tim Roughgarden
- Bimal Kumar Roy
- Marie-Françoise Roy
- Gordon Royle
- Grzegorz Rozenberg
- Jean E. Rubin
- Ronitt Rubinfeld
- Ariel Rubinstein
- J. Hyam Rubinstein
- Steven Rudich
- Walter Rudin
- Zeev Rudnick
- Arunas Rudvalis
- Sushmita Ruj
- Czesław Ryll-Nardzewski
- Robert Rumely
- Frank Ruskey
- H. J. Ryser

=== S ===
- Donald G. Saari
- Thomas L. Saaty
- Gert Sabidussi
- Jörg-Rüdiger Sack
- Edward B. Saff
- Shmuel Safra
- Jawad Salehi
- Raphaël Salem
- Lee Sallows
- Arto Salomaa
- Wojciech Samotij
- E. Sampathkumar
- Peter Sanders
- David Sankoff
- Palash Sarkar
- Peter Sarnak
- Daihachiro Sato
- Lisa Sauermann
- Carla Savage
- John E. Savage
- Najiba Sbihi
- Mathias Schacht
- Gideon Schechtman
- Marion Scheepers
- Boris M. Schein
- Ed Scheinerman
- Wolfgang M. Schmidt
- Claus P. Schnorr
- Hans Schneider
- Isaac Jacob Schoenberg
- Norman Schofield
- Arnold Schönhage
- Oded Schramm
- Alexander Schrijver
- Richard Schroeppel
- Issai Schur
- Jacob T. Schwartz
- Dana Scott
- Jennifer Seberry
- Thomas Dyer Seeley
- Raimund Seidel
- Gary Seitz
- Atle Selberg
- Eugene Seneta
- Jean-Pierre Serre
- Brigitte Servatius
- Simone Severini
- Paul Seymour
- Freydoon Shahidi
- Aner Shalev
- Adi Shamir
- Eli Shamir
- Ron Shamir
- Daniel Shanks
- Micha Sharir
- Dennis Shasha
- Nir Shavit
- Scott Shenker
- G. C. Shephard
- Lawrence Shepp
- Goro Shimura
- David Shmoys
- Peter Shor
- Richard Shore
- Robert Shostak
- S. S. Shrikhande
- Wacław Sierpiński
- Joseph H. Silverman
- Barry Simon
- Alistair Sinclair
- Steven Skiena
- Christopher Skinner
- Thoralf Skolem
- Brian Skyrms
- Gordon Douglas Slade
- David Slepian
- Neil Sloane
- Cedric Smith
- Temple F. Smith
- Hunter Snevily
- Marc Snir
- Gustave Solomon
- Ronald Solomon
- Robert M. Solovay
- József Solymosi
- Kannan Soundararajan
- Diane Souvaine
- Gene Spafford
- Bettina Speckmann
- Terry Speed
- M. Grazia Speranza
- Sarah Spurgeon
- Katherine St. John
- Kaye Stacey
- Jessica Staddon
- Ludwig Staiger
- Richard P. Stanley
- Ralph Gordon Stanton
- Michael Starbird
- Harold Stark
- Sergey Stechkin
- Mike Steel
- J. Michael Steele
- Angelika Steger
- Kenneth Steiglitz
- Elias M. Stein
- Maya Stein
- Hugo Steinhaus
- Jacques Stern
- Shlomo Sternberg
- Bonnie Stewart
- Lorna Stewart
- Larry Stockmeyer
- Ivan Stojmenović
- Jorge Stolfi
- Marshall Harvey Stone
- Michael Stonebraker
- Volker Strassen
- Dona Strauss
- Ileana Streinu
- Daniel W. Stroock
- Bernd Sturmfels
- Francis Su
- Benny Sudakov
- Madhu Sudan
- David Sumner
- Patrick Suppes
- Sun Zhiwei
- Subhash Suri
- Klaus Sutner
- Peter Swinnerton-Dyer
- Balázs Szegedy
- Stefan Szeider
- Gábor J. Székely
- Ágnes Szendrei
- Lajos Szilassi
- Wanda Szmielew
- Tamás Szőnyi
- Jayme Luiz Szwarcfiter

=== T ===
- Tomohiro Tachi
- Gaisi Takeuti
- Dov Tamari
- David Tannor
- Terence Tao
- Richard A. Tapia
- Éva Tardos
- Gábor Tardos
- Robert Tarjan
- Olga Taussky-Todd
- Herman te Riele
- Vanessa Teague
- Max Tegmark
- Shang-Hua Teng
- Bridget Tenner
- Katrin Tent
- Audrey Terras
- Diana Thomas
- Robin Thomas
- Heidi Thornquist
- Mikkel Thorup
- William Thurston
- Robert Tichy
- Andrey Nikolayevich Tikhonov
- Naftali Tishby
- John Todd
- Stevo Todorčević
- Nicole Tomczak-Jaegermann
- Tatiana Toro
- Godfried Toussaint
- Marilyn Tremaine
- Ann Trenk
- Luca Trevisan
- Michael Trick
- Jan Trlifaj
- Věra Trnková
- John Tromp
- John Truss
- Marcello Truzzi
- Alan Tucker
- Albert W. Tucker
- Thomas W. Tucker
- Bryant Tuckerman
- John Tukey
- Helge Tverberg

=== U ===
- George Uhlenbeck
- Jeffrey Ullman
- Chris Umans
- Eli Upfal
- Jorge Urrutia

=== V ===
- Jouko Väänänen
- Robert J. Vanderbei
- Harry Vandiver
- Scott Vanstone
- S. R. Srinivasa Varadhan
- Alexander Vardy
- Richard S. Varga
- George Varghese
- Robert Lawson Vaught
- Umesh Vazirani
- Vijay Vazirani
- Santosh Vempala
- Michèle Vergne
- Anatoly Vershik
- Victor Vianu
- Jonathan David Victor
- Mathukumalli Vidyasagar
- Uzi Vishkin
- Vadim G. Vizing
- Margit Voigt
- José Felipe Voloch
- Richard von Mises
- Marc Voorhoeve
- Petr Vopěnka
- Gheorghe Vrănceanu
- Van H. Vu

=== W ===
- Dorothea Wagner
- Stan Wagon
- Abraham Wald
- Michel Waldschmidt
- David J. Wales
- Arnold Walfisz
- Judy L. Walker
- Joseph L. Walsh
- Yusu Wang
- Ian Wanless
- John Clive Ward
- Tandy Warnow
- Stefan E. Warschawski
- Johan Wästlund
- Michael Waterman
- Gerhard Weikum
- Hans Weinberger
- Peter J. Weinberger
- Benjamin Weiss
- Guido Weiss
- Mary Ann Weitnauer
- Lloyd R. Welch
- Dominic Welsh
- Emo Welzl
- Carola Wenk
- Harald Wergeland
- Andrew B. Whinston
- Douglas R. White
- Sue Whitesides
- Hassler Whitney
- David Widder
- Harold Widom
- Norbert Wiener
- Avi Wigderson
- Mark Wilde
- Herbert Wilf
- Alex Wilkie
- Yorick Wilks
- Hugh C. Williams
- Ruth J. Williams
- Robert Arnott Wilson
- Shmuel Winograd
- Andreas Winter
- Hans Witsenhausen
- Mariusz Wodzicki
- Gerhard J. Woeginger
- Jack Wolf
- Marek Wolf
- Thomas Wolff
- Jacob Wolfowitz
- Stephen Wolfram
- Carol Wood
- W. Hugh Woodin
- Trevor Wooley
- John Wrench
- E. M. Wright
- Rebecca N. Wright
- Mario Wschebor
- Angela Y. Wu
- Donald Wunsch
- Max Wyman
- Aaron D. Wyner

=== Y ===
- Catherine Yan
- Mihalis Yannakakis
- Martin Yarmush
- Andrew Yao
- Shing-Tung Yau
- Bülent Yener
- Cem Yıldırım
- Yiqun Lisa Yin
- J. W. T. Youngs
- Moti Yung

=== Z ===
- Adriaan Cornelis Zaanen
- Stathis Zachos
- Don Zagier
- Alexandru Zaharescu
- Thomas Zaslavsky
- Hans Zassenhaus
- Lenka Zdeborová
- Doron Zeilberger
- Karl Longin Zeller
- Ping Zhang
- Günter M. Ziegler
- Tamar Ziegler
- Paul Zimmermann
- Nivio Ziviani
- Vaclav Zizler
- Štefan Znám
- David Zuckerman
- Wadim Zudilin
- Uri Zwick
- William S. Zwicker
- Antoni Zygmund

== Three ==
=== A ===
- Ronald Aarts
- Wil van der Aalst
- Scott Aaronson
- Eduardo Abeliuk
- Hal Abelson
- Ralph Abraham
- Mohammed Abouzaid
- Carlisle Adams
- Colin Adams
- Frank Adams
- Jeffrey D. Adams
- Alejandro Adem
- Roy Adler
- Vaneet Aggarwal
- Ian Agol
- Manindra Agrawal
- Yakir Aharonov
- Lars Ahlfors
- Alfred Aho
- Michael Aizenman
- Naum Akhiezer
- Stephanie B. Alexander
- Pavel Alexandrov
- Valery Alexeev
- Elizabeth S. Allman
- Jonathan Lazare Alperin
- Rajeev Alur
- Nancy M. Amato
- Giovanni Amelino-Camelia
- Nina Amenta
- Shimshon Amitsur
- Martyn Amos
- Ross J. Anderson
- Dmitri Anosov
- Edward Appleton
- Huzihiro Araki
- Shlomo Argamon
- Lars Arge
- Alexander Arhangelskii
- Vladimir Arnold
- Donald Aronson
- Nachman Aronszajn
- Kenneth Arrow
- Sergei N. Artemov
- James Arthur
- Michael Artin
- Matthias Aschenbrenner
- Richard Aster
- Karl Johan Åström
- Krassimir Atanassov
- Frederick Valentine Atkinson
- David August
- Robert Aumann
- Jeremy Avigad
- Artur Avila
- Luchezar L. Avramov
- Steve Awodey
- James Ax
- Richard Axel
- Ofer Azar
- Andréa W. Richa

=== B ===
- Franz Baader
- John C. Baez
- Ricardo Baeza Rodríguez
- Jennifer Balakrishnan
- John M. Ball
- Keith Martin Ball
- W. W. Rouse Ball
- Thomas Banchoff
- Yehoshua Bar-Hillel
- Rina Foygel Barber
- Nina Bari
- Dwight Barkley
- Paulo S. L. M. Barreto
- Marc Barthelemy
- Nayandeep Deka Baruah
- Kaye Basford
- Hyman Bass
- Richard F. Bass
- Hannah Bast
- Peter W. Bates
- Victor Batyrev
- Paul Baum
- Gilbert Baumslag
- Glen E. Baxter
- Samuel Beatty
- Arnaud Beauville
- Carlo Beenakker
- Robert Behringer
- Jason Behrstock
- John Lane Bell
- Mihir Bellare
- Mordechai Ben-Ari
- John Benedetto
- Yoshua Bengio
- Charles H. Bennett
- Jonathan Bennett
- Michele Benzi
- Henri Berestycki
- Zvi Bern
- Robert Bernecky
- Douglas Bernheim
- Daniel J. Bernstein
- Dimitri Bertsekas
- Michele Besso
- Hans Bethe
- Stefano Bianchini
- Edward Bierstone
- Eli Biham
- Sara Billey
- Sundance Bilson-Thompson
- Katalin Bimbó
- George David Birkhoff
- Joan Birman
- Alex Biryukov
- Richard L. Bishop
- Robert G. Bland
- David Blei
- Spencer Bloch
- Richard Earl Block
- Leonard Blumenthal
- Otto Blumenthal
- David Bohm
- Harald Bohr
- Andrei Bolibrukh
- George Boolos
- Armand Borel
- Max Born
- Mikhail V. Borovoi
- Nigel Boston
- Raoul Bott
- Onno J. Boxma
- Robert S. Boyer
- Elette Boyle
- Samuel L. Braunstein
- Marilyn Breen
- Alberto Bressan
- Emmanuel Breuillard
- Haïm Brezis
- Martin Bridson
- Sergey Brin
- Roger W. Brockett
- Thomas John I'Anson Bromwich
- Michel Broué
- William Browder
- Lawrie Brown
- Morton Brown
- W. Dale Brownawell
- Babette Brumback
- Viggo Brun
- Oscar Bruno
- David Buchsbaum
- Adhemar Bultheel
- Donald Burkholder

=== C ===
- Luis Caffarelli
- Russel E. Caflisch
- Guido Caldarelli
- Alberto Calderón
- Danny Calegari
- Robert Horton Cameron
- James W. Cannon
- John Canny
- Constantin Carathéodory
- Jaime Carbonell
- Walter Carnielli
- Sean M. Carroll
- Élie Cartan
- Henri Cartan
- Mary Cartwright
- Carlos Castillo-Chavez
- Zoia Ceaușescu
- Gregory Chaitin
- Venkat Chandrasekaran
- Sun-Yung Alice Chang
- Ruth Charney
- Georges Charpak
- Bidyut Baran Chaudhuri
- David Chaum
- Jeff Cheeger
- Xiuxiong Chen
- Shiu-Yuen Cheng
- Cheon Jung-hee
- Herman Chernoff
- Andrew Childs
- Frederic T. Chong
- Gustave Choquet
- Yvonne Choquet-Bruhat
- Howie Choset
- Brian Christian
- Demetrios Christodoulou
- Vivian Chu
- Isaac Chuang
- Philippe G. Ciarlet
- Mitrofan Cioban
- Kenneth L. Clarkson
- Alfred H. Clifford
- Tim Cochran
- David X. Cohen
- Robert F. Coleman
- Peter Coles
- Francis Collins
- Jean-Louis Colliot-Thélène
- David Colquhoun
- Pierre Conner
- Alain Connes
- Stephen Cook
- Jerome Cornfield
- Athel Cornish-Bowden
- Richard Courant
- Michael Cowling
- David A. Cox
- David Cox
- Ronald Cramer
- Michael G. Crandall
- Marc Culler
- Joachim Cuntz
- Charles W. Curtis
- Thomas Curtright

=== D ===
- Angelo Dalli
- Sajal K. Das
- Ingrid Daubechies
- James H. Davenport
- Paul Davies
- Chandler Davis
- Martin Davis
- Louis de Branges de Bourcia
- Louis de Broglie
- Willem de Sitter
- Gérard Debreu
- Percy Deift
- Pierre Deligne
- Ben Delo
- Jesús A. De Loera
- Ronald de Wolf
- Martin Demaine
- Laura DeMarco
- James Demmel
- Jan Denef
- Dennis DeTurck
- Mike Develin
- Florin Diacu
- Matthew T. Dickerson
- Jean Dieudonné
- Whitfield Diffie
- Robbert Dijkgraaf
- Robert P. Dilworth
- Peter Dinda
- David DiVincenzo
- Stanislav George Djorgovski
- Roland Dobrushin
- Manfredo do Carmo
- John Dalgleish Donaldson
- Simon Donaldson
- Jack Dongarra
- Sergio Doplicher
- Dov Dori
- Michael R. Douglas
- Paul Dourish
- Clifford Hugh Dowker
- Lester Dubins
- Harvey Dubner
- Richard M. Dudley
- George F. D. Duff
- Iain S. Duff
- James Dugundji
- Rafal E. Dunin-Borkowski
- Jon Michael Dunn
- Marcus du Sautoy
- Eugene Dynkin

=== E ===
- John Eccles
- Beno Eckmann
- Jean-Pierre Eckmann
- Alan Edelman
- William Edge
- A. W. F. Edwards
- Michelle Effros
- Nikolai Efimov
- Ellen Eischen
- Yakov Eliashberg
- Jordan Ellenberg
- George A. Elliott
- Robert J. Elliott
- George F. R. Ellis
- Richard Elman
- Ryszard Engelking
- Charles Epstein
- Arthur Erdélyi
- Karin Erdmann
- Alex Eskin
- Pavel Etingof
- Lawrence C. Evans

=== F ===
- Ludvig Faddeev
- Gerd Faltings
- Benson Farb
- Edward Farhi
- Herbert Federer
- Anita Burdman Feferman
- Joan Feigenbaum
- Walter Feit
- Edward Felten
- Werner Fenchel
- Enrico Fermi
- Arran Fernandez
- Richard Feynman
- Tim Finin
- Thomas Fink
- Raphael Finkel
- Hilary Finucane
- Dana Fisman
- Melvin Fitting
- Luciano Floridi
- Adriaan Fokker
- Gerald Folland
- Sergey Fomin
- Irene Fonseca
- L. R. Ford Jr.
- Alexandra Illmer Forsythe
- Ian Foster
- Ralph Fox
- Paul Frampton
- Maurice René Fréchet
- Benedict Freedman
- Laurent Freidel
- Herta Freitag
- Edward Frenkel
- Peter J. Freyd
- Susan Friedlander
- Avner Friedman
- Orrin Frink
- Hans Freudenthal
- Uriel Frisch
- Ferdinand Georg Frobenius
- Jürg Fröhlich
- Christopher A. Fuchs
- Bent Fuglede
- Kenichi Fukui
- Wayne A. Fuller
- Thomas Fung
- Reinhold Furth

=== G ===
- David Gabai
- Ofer Gabber
- Walter Gage
- Robert G. Gallager
- Giovanni Gallavotti
- Joseph Gallian
- Irene M. Gamba
- Héctor García-Molina
- Artur d'Avila Garcez
- Richard Garfield
- Skip Garibaldi
- Adriano Garsia
- Ann Gates
- Hilda Geiringer
- Erol Gelenbe
- Alan E. Gelfand
- Israel Gelfand
- Alexander Gelfond
- Murray Gell-Mann
- Andrew Gelman
- Stuart Geman
- J. Alan George
- Darren Gergle
- Teena Gerhardt
- Fritz Gesztesy
- Ezra Getzler
- Eknath Prabhakar Ghate
- Jayanta Kumar Ghosh
- Gary Gibbons
- Garth Gibson
- Peter B. Gilkey
- Jane Piore Gilman
- Seymour Ginsburg
- Ennio De Giorgi
- Samuel Gitler Hammer
- Leslie Greengard
- George Glauberman
- Andrew M. Gleason
- Paul Glendinning
- James Glimm
- Roland Glowinski
- Kurt Gödel
- William Goldman
- Andrew Goldstein
- Jerome Goldstein
- Robert Gompf
- Francisco Javier González-Acuña
- Michael T. Goodrich
- Maria Gordina
- Carolyn S. Gordon
- Rudolf Gorenflo
- Daniel Gorenstein
- Lothar Göttsche
- Ian Goulden
- Jeremy Gray
- Mary W. Gray
- Matthew D. Green
- Brian Greene
- Robert Griess
- Phillip Griffiths
- Rostislav Grigorchuk
- Uwe Grimm
- Piet Groeneboom
- Jacob Grommer
- Mikhail Leonidovich Gromov
- Alexander Grothendieck
- Benedict Gross
- Edna Grossman
- Marcel Grossmann
- John Guckenheimer
- Victor Guillemin
- Robert C. Gunning

=== H ===
- Rudolf Haag
- Christopher Hacon
- Jacques Hadamard
- Mark Haiman
- Petr Hájek
- Thomas Callister Hales
- Mary Hall
- Peter Gavin Hall
- Joseph Halpern
- Richard S. Hamilton
- Michael Handel
- Robin Hanson
- David Harbater
- David Harel
- Peter G. Harrison
- George W. Hart
- Peter E. Hart
- Vi Hart
- James Hartle
- Juris Hartmanis
- Robin Hartshorne
- Allen Hatcher
- Herbert A. Hauptman
- Jane M. Hawkins
- Michael Heath
- Roger Heath-Brown
- Werner Heisenberg
- Dennis Hejhal
- Sigurður Helgason
- Martin Hellman
- Nadia Heninger
- Monika Henzinger
- Gustav Herglotz
- Maurice Herlihy
- Dudley R. Herschbach
- Jan S. Hesthaven
- Chris Heyde
- Theophil Henry Hildebrandt
- Geoffrey Hinton
- Morris Hirsch
- Friedrich Hirzebruch
- Tony Hoare
- Gerhard Hochschild
- Melvin Hochster
- Roald Hoffmann
- Maria Hoffmann-Ostenhof
- Guido Hoheisel
- Helge Holden
- Christopher Hooley
- John Hopcroft
- Ludwig Hopf
- Lars Hörmander
- Michał Horodecki
- Paweł Horodecki
- Ryszard Horodecki
- Susan Howson
- Andrew Houck
- Juraj Hromkovič
- Hua Luogeng
- Nicolaas Marinus Hugenholtz
- June Huh
- András P Huhn
- Gerhard Huisken
- Craig Huneke
- Julian Huppert
- Steven Hurder
- Michael Hutchings
- Rob J. Hyndman

=== I ===
- Jun-Ichi Igusa
- Masatoshi Gündüz Ikeda
- Nicole Immorlica
- Leopold Infeld
- Adrian Ioana
- Dmitry Ioffe
- Victor Isakov
- Giuseppe F. Italiano
- Kiyosi Itô
- Kenneth E. Iverson
- Victor Ivrii
- Shokichi Iyanaga

=== J ===
- William Jaco
- Nathan Jacobson
- Hervé Jacquet
- Arthur Jaffe
- Antal Jákli
- Markus Jakobsson
- Zvonimir Janko
- Jens Carsten Jantzen
- Ronald Jensen
- Aimee Johnson
- Selmer M. Johnson
- Peter Johnstone
- Jonathan A. Jones
- Vaughan Jones
- Michael I. Jordan
- Pascual Jordan
- Jerzy Jurka

=== K ===
- Victor Kac
- Daniel Kahneman
- Yael Tauman Kalai
- Burt Kaliski
- Rudolf E. Kálmán
- Niky Kamran
- Daniel Kane
- Max Karoubi
- Kevin Karplus
- Daniel Kastler
- Michael Katehakis
- Anatole Katok
- Svetlana Katok
- David Kazhdan
- Kiran Kedlaya
- Christine Kelley
- John L. Kelley
- Frank Kelly
- George Kempf
- Brian Kernighan
- Barbara Keyfitz
- Mohamed Amine Khamsi
- Chandrashekhar Khare
- Olga Kharlampovich
- Subhash Khot
- Clive W. Kilmister
- Robion Kirby
- Alexandre Kirillov
- Frances Kirwan
- Laszlo B. Kish
- Mark Kisin
- Steven Kleiman
- Martin J. Klein
- Jon Kleinberg
- Anthony W. Knapp
- Julia F. Knight
- Eberhard Knobloch
- Lars Ramkilde Knudsen
- Christof Koch
- Eddie Kohler
- Joseph J. Kohn
- Walter Kohn
- Daphne Koller
- Arthur Komar
- Maxim Kontsevich
- Robert Kottwitz
- Joseph Kouneiher
- Christoph Koutschan
- Irwin Kra
- Lawrence M. Krauss
- Hans-Peter Kriegel
- Saul Kripke
- Jonas Kubilius
- Vera Kublanovskaya
- Benjamin Kuipers
- Ravi S. Kulkarni
- Shrawan Kumar
- Subodha Kumar
- H. T. Kung
- Ray Kunze
- Philip Kutzko

=== L ===
- Izabella Łaba
- Michael Lacey
- Olga Ladyzhenskaya
- Xuejia Lai
- Nan Laird
- Monica S. Lam
- Willis Lamb
- Leslie Lamport
- Alfred Landé
- Peter Landweber
- Carl Landwehr
- Oscar Lanford
- Robert J. Lang
- Serge Lang
- Michael J. Larsen
- Irena Lasiecka
- Jakob Laub
- Greg Lawler
- Ruth Lawrence
- H. Blaine Lawson
- William Lawvere
- Peter Lax
- Robert Lazarsfeld
- Joel Lebowitz
- John Leech
- Solomon Lefschetz
- Olli Lehto
- Richard Leibler
- Richard Lenski
- James Lepowsky
- Jean Leray
- Randall J. LeVeque
- Simon A. Levin
- David K. Levine
- Harold Levine
- Michael Levitt
- Azriel Lévy
- Marta Lewicka
- Harry R. Lewis
- Hans Lewy
- Mark Liberman
- Victor Lidskii
- Lin Fanghua
- Michael Lin
- Yehuda Lindell
- Elon Lindenstrauss
- Joseph Lipman
- Michael L. Littman
- Chiu-Chu Melissa Liu
- Jean-Louis Loday
- François Loeser
- Nikos Logothetis
- Eduard Looijenga
- Cristina Lopes
- Hendrik Lorentz
- Peter James Lorimer
- Jerzy Łoś
- Michael Loss
- Abraham S. Luchins
- Yuri Luchko
- John Edwin Luecke
- Jacob Lurie
- George Lusztig
- Wilhelmus Luxemburg
- Nancy Lynch
- Richard Lyons
- Mikhail Lyubich

=== M ===
- Tal Malkin
- Clyde Martin
- Serge Massar
- William G. McCallum
- Dusa McDuff
- Saunders Mac Lane
- Curtis T. McMullen
- Robert MacPherson
- Frank McSherry
- Gilean McVean
- Kathleen Madden
- Ib Madsen
- Mark Mahowald
- Andrew Majda
- David Makinson
- Benoit Mandelbrot
- Michelle Manes
- Yuri Manin
- Norman Margolus
- Grigory Margulis
- Robert J. Marks II
- Marco Marra
- David B. Massey
- Varghese Mathai
- John N. Mather
- Mitsuru Matsui
- Arthur Mattuck
- Ueli Maurer
- Margaret Maxfield
- J. Peter May
- Walther Mayer
- Vladimir Mazya
- Lambert Meertens
- Alexander Merkurjev
- N. David Mermin
- Chikako Mese
- Silvio Micali
- Haynes Miller
- Pierre Milman
- James Milne
- John Milnor
- Hermann Minkowski
- James Mirrlees
- Maryam Mirzakhani
- Irina Mitrea
- Yurii Mitropolskiy
- Yoichi Miyaoka
- Cleve Moler
- Alexander Molev
- Faron Moller
- Christopher Monroe
- Richard Montague
- Deane Montgomery
- Susan Montgomery
- Calvin C. Moore
- Greg Moore
- John Coleman Moore
- Manfred Morari
- Cathleen Synge Morawetz
- Ernesto Mordecki
- Boris Mordukhovich
- Shigefumi Mori
- Richard I. Morimoto
- Kiiti Morita
- David R. Morrison
- Michele Mosca
- Yiannis N. Moschovakis
- Jürgen Moser
- Marcos Moshinsky
- Emmy Murphy
- Sean Murphy
- John Myhill

=== N ===
- Leopoldo Nachbin
- M. G. Nadkarni
- Masayoshi Nagata
- Daniel K. Nakano
- Tadashi Nakayama
- Seema Nanda
- Raghavan Narasimhan
- John Forbes Nash Jr.
- Frank Natterer
- Dana S. Nau
- Anil Nerode
- Claudia Neuhauser
- John von Neumann
- Heidi Jo Newberg
- Mark Newman
- Ngô Bảo Châu
- Oscar Nierstrasz
- Albert Nijenhuis
- Louis Nirenberg
- Kobbi Nissim
- Emmy Noether
- James R. Norris
- Pyotr Novikov
- Sergei Novikov
- H. Pierre Noyes

=== O ===
- Joseph Oesterlé
- Hee Oh
- Peter O'Hearn
- Andrei Okounkov
- Dianne P. O'Leary
- Olga Oleinik
- Peter J. Olver
- Rosa Orellana
- Lars Onsager
- Alexander Oppenheim
- Øystein Ore
- Władysław Orlicz
- Stanley Osher
- Steven J. Ostro
- Ross Overbeek
- Mark Overmars
- Michael Overton

=== P ===
- Don Page
- Larry Page
- David Paget
- Richard Palais
- Raymond Paley
- Jacob Palis
- Victor Pan
- Greta Panova
- Christos Papadimitriou
- George C. Papanicolaou
- Seymour Papert
- Raman Parimala
- David Park
- Stephen Parke
- Beresford Parlett
- Karen Parshall
- Mihai Pătrașcu
- Wolfgang Pauli
- Jean Pedersen
- Irena Peeva
- Kirsi Peltonen
- Steven Pemberton
- Roger Penrose
- Colin Percival
- Grigori Perelman
- Asher Peres
- John Perry (philosopher)
- Miodrag Petković
- Linda Petzold
- Jean Piaget
- Georg Alexander Pick
- Ragni Piene
- Josef Pieprzyk
- Jill Pipher
- Max Planck
- John Platt
- Rudolf Podgornik
- Boris Podolsky
- Martyn Poliakoff
- Hugh David Politzer
- Harriet Pollatsek
- Lev Pontryagin
- Florian Pop
- Vladimir Leonidovich Popov
- Tom Porter
- Gopal Prasad
- Bart Preneel
- William H. Press
- Ilya Prigogine
- Jose Principe
- Enrique Pujals
- Geoffrey K. Pullum
- Hilary Putnam
- Ilya Piatetski-Shapiro

=== Q ===
- Daniel Quillen
- Frank Quinn

=== R ===
- Tal Rabin
- Paul Rabinowitz
- Hans Rademacher
- Tibor Radó
- M. S. Raghunathan
- Srinivasa Ramanujan
- Norman Ramsey
- Helena Rasiowa
- Douglas Ravenel
- Michael C. Reed
- David Rees
- Aviv Regev
- Zinovy Reichstein
- John H. Reif
- Howard L. Resnikoff
- Paulo Ribenboim
- Ken Ribet
- John T. Riedl
- Marc Rieffel
- Emily Riehl
- Loren H. Rieseberg
- Vincent Rijmen
- Donald Ringe
- Dennis Ritchie
- Igor Rivin
- Neil Robertson
- Julia Robinson
- Tony Robinson
- Matt Robshaw
- Phillip Rogaway
- Mikael Rørdam
- Nathan Rosen
- Murray Rosenblatt
- Pierre Rosenstiehl
- Hugo Rossi
- Markus Rost
- Alvin E. Roth
- Hermann Rothe
- Paul W. K. Rothemund
- Linda Preiss Rothschild
- David E. Rowe
- Samarendra Nath Roy
- Karl Rubin
- David Ruelle
- Mari-Jo P. Ruiz
- Mary Beth Ruskai

=== S ===
- Pardis Sabeti
- Gerald Sacks
- Amit Sahai
- Anupam Saikia
- Abdus Salam
- Paul Sally
- Alexander Samarskii
- Leonard Sarason
- Michael Saunders
- Pierre Schapira
- Doris Schattschneider
- Anne Schilling
- Michael Schlessinger
- Tamar Schlick
- Wilfried Schmid
- Gavin Schmidt
- Bruce Schneier
- Richard Schoen
- Robert Scholtz
- Jan Arnoldus Schouten
- Erwin Schrödinger
- G. Peter Scott
- Robert Thomas Seeley
- Ed Seidel
- Kristian Seip
- Jasjeet S. Sekhon
- Marjorie Senechal
- Reinhard Selten
- Caroline Series
- C. S. Seshadri
- Suresh P. Sethi
- Igor Shafarevich
- Chehrzad Shakiban
- Nikolai Shanin
- Claude Shannon
- Norman Shapiro
- Lloyd Shapley
- Diana Shelstad
- Nicholas Shepherd-Barron
- Amin Shokrollahi
- Victor Shoup
- Chi-Wang Shu
- Michael Shub
- Mikhail Shubin
- Laurent C. Siebenmann
- Carl Ludwig Siegel
- Joseph Sifakis
- Israel Michael Sigal
- Roman Sikorski
- Jack Silver
- Alice Silverberg
- Rodica Simion
- Herbert A. Simon
- Leon Simon
- Jim Simons
- Charles Sims
- Yakov Sinai
- Alistair Sinclair
- Isadore Singer
- Anna Skripka
- Theodore Slaman
- Anatol Slissenko
- Ian Sloan
- Nigel Smart
- Stanislav Smirnov
- Adam Davison Smith
- Hamilton O. Smith
- Agata Smoktunowicz
- John A. Smolin
- Robert I. Soare
- Sergei Sobolev
- Alan Sokal
- Eduardo D. Sontag
- Ralf J. Spatzier
- Donald C. Spencer
- Thomas Spencer
- Emanuel Sperner
- David Spiegelhalter
- Daniel Spielman
- Herbert Spohn
- Vasudevan Srinivas
- Bhama Srinivasan
- J. N. Srivastava
- Gigliola Staffilani
- John R. Steel
- Guy L. Steele Jr.
- Norman Steenrod
- Charles M. Stein
- Robert Steinberg
- Otto Stern
- Ian Stewart
- Clifford Stoll
- Gary Stormo
- Erling Størmer
- Gilbert Strang
- Steven Strogatz
- Michael Struwe
- Catherine Sulem
- Endre Süli
- Dennis Sullivan
- John M. Sullivan
- John Sulston
- Nike Sun
- Michio Suzuki
- Richard Swan
- Katia Sycara
- Stanisław Szarek
- Tibor Szele
- Lucien Szpiro
- Daniel B. Szyld
- Bolesław Szymański

=== T ===
- Sergei Tabachnikov
- Eitan Tadmor
- Daina Taimiņa
- Floris Takens
- Masamichi Takesaki
- Jacob David Tamarkin
- Desney Tan
- Yutaka Taniyama
- Daniel Tătaru
- John Tate
- Angus Ellis Taylor
- G. I. Taylor
- Jean Taylor
- Michael E. Taylor
- Richard Taylor
- Sridhar Tayur
- Bernard Teissier
- Edward Teller
- Roger Temam
- Barbara Terhal
- Chuu-Lian Terng
- Joseph Terwilliger
- Gerald Teschl
- Bernhard Thalheim
- Morwen Thistlethwaite
- George B. Thomas
- Rekha R. Thomas
- Richard Thomas
- Abigail Thompson
- John G. Thompson
- Ulrike Tillmann
- Wolfgang A. Tomé
- Craig Tracy
- Joseph F. Traub
- Lloyd N. Trefethen
- François Trèves
- Satish K. Tripathi
- Hale Trotter
- Stanisław Trybuła
- Boris Tsirelson
- Laurette Tuckerman

=== U ===
- Karen Uhlenbeck
- Gunther Uhlmann
- William G. Unruh
- Alasdair Urquhart

=== V ===
- Salil Vadhan
- Cumrun Vafa
- Vinod Vaikuntanathan
- Ravi Vakil
- Leslie Valiant
- Michel Van den Bergh
- Bartel Leendert van der Waerden
- Leon van der Torre
- Peter van Emde Boas
- Charles F. Van Loan
- Moshe Vardi
- Serge Vaudenay
- Helmut Veith
- T. N. Venkataramana
- Craig Venter
- Rineke Verbrugge
- Sergiy Vilkomir
- Cédric Villani
- Vernor Vinge
- Oleg Viro
- Monica Vișan
- Michael Viscardi
- Paul Vitányi
- Karen Vogtmann
- Dan-Virgil Voiculescu
- Paul Vojta
- Dieter Vollhardt
- Theodore von Kármán
- Vlad Voroninski

=== W ===
- Michelle L. Wachs
- David A. Wagner
- Dorothy Wallace
- Nolan Wallach
- Brian Wandell
- Hao Wang
- John Watrous
- G. N. Watson
- Richard Weber
- Stephanie Wehner
- Charles Weibel
- Steven Weinberg
- Shmuel Weinberger
- Alan Weinstein
- Sherman Weissman
- Tsachy Weissman
- Eric W. Weisstein
- Philip Welch
- Barry Wellman
- Raymond O. Wells Jr.
- Katrin Wendland
- Elisabeth M. Werner
- Wendelin Werner
- Jeff Westbrook
- Hermann Weyl
- John Archibald Wheeler
- Arthur Whitney
- Jennifer Widom
- Gio Wiederhold
- Sylvia Wiegand
- Eugene Wigner
- Frank Wilczek
- Andrew Wiles
- Lauren Williams
- Ryan Williams
- Virginia Vassilevska Williams
- David J. Wineland
- Erik Winfree
- Terry Winograd
- Jean-Pierre Wintenberger
- Daniel Wise
- Edward Witten
- Joseph A. Wolf
- Julia Wolf
- Melanie Wood
- William Wootters
- Margaret H. Wright
- Fa-Yueh Wu
- Jang-Mei Wu
- Jie Wu
- Joshua Wurman
- Gisbert Wüstholz

=== X ===
- Dianna Xu
- Jinchao Xu

=== Y ===
- Chen-Ning Yang
- Taha Yasseri
- Horng-Tzer Yau
- Vadim Yefremovich
- Cem Yıldırım
- Jean-Christophe Yoccoz
- James A. Yorke
- Noriko Yui

=== Z ===
- Norman Zabusky
- Lotfi A. Zadeh
- George Zames
- Oscar Zariski
- Eduard Zehnder
- Andrei Zelevinsky
- Efim Zelmanov
- Robert Zimmer
- Yaakov Ziv
- Max August Zorn
- Steven Zucker

== See also ==
- Mathematics Genealogy Project
- Six degrees of separation
