= Oggier =

Oggier is a surname. Notable people with this name include:

- Andreas Oggier, Swiss runner in 2000 World Junior Championships in Athletics – Men's 4 × 100 metres relay
- Frédérique Oggier, Swiss and Singaporean mathematician
- Luc Oggier, Swiss musician in rap duo Lo & Leduc
- Manfred Oggier (born 1972), Swiss footballer
