= Angeleri =

Angeleri is an Italian surname. Notable people with the surname include:

- Lidia Angeleri Hügel (born 1960), Italian mathematician
- Marcos Angeleri (born 1983), Argentine footballer
- Stefano Angeleri (1926–2012), Italian footballer and manager
