= Thornquist =

Thornquist or Thörnquist is a surname. Notable people with the surname include:

- Annika Thörnquist (born 1971), Swedish pop music singer
- Heidi Thornquist, American applied mathematician
- Lillian Thornquist, harpist on Aura (Miles Davis album)
