= Sandee =

Sandee is both a given name and surname. Notable people with the name include:

- Jan Sandee (1919–2011), Dutch economist
- Sandeé (1962–2008), American freestyle music vocalist
- Sandee (Swiss singer) (born 1976)
- SanDeE*, character from L.A. Story
- Sandee Birdsong, contestant of Top Chef: Miami
- Sandee Chan (born 1970), Taiwanese singer-songwriter, music producer and director
- Sandee Hedetniemi (born 1949), American mathematician and computer scientist
- Sandee Noel (born 1941), American actress and entertainer

== See also ==
- Sandy (disambiguation)
