= Jan Trlifaj =

Czech mathematician

- Born: 30 December 1954 (age 71)
- Education: Charles University
- Scientific career
- Fields: Algebra; Representation theory
- Workplaces: Charles University
- Thesis: Associative rings and the Whitehead property of modules (1989)
- Doctoral advisor: Ladislav Bican

Jan Trlifaj (born 30 December 1954) is a Czech mathematician. He is a professor of mathematics at Charles University whose research interests include commutative algebra, homological algebra and representation theory.

== Career and research ==
Jan Trlifaj studied mathematics at the Faculty of Mathematics and Physics, Charles University, from which he received MSc. in 1979, Ph.D. in 1989 under Ladislav Bican. and Prof. of Mathematics in the field Algebra and number theory in 2009.

In the academic year 1994/95 he had the position as Postdoctoral Fellow of the Royal Society at Department of Mathematics at University of Manchester. In Fall 1998 he received the J.W.Fulbright Scholarship at the Department of Mathematics, University California at Irvine. During Fall 2002 and 2006 he was a visiting professor at Centre de Recerca Matemàtica, Barcelona. Since 1990, he has completed numerous short term visiting appointments and given over 100 invited lectures at conferences and seminars worldwide.

Since 2017, he is Fellow of Learned Society of the Czech Republic.

He served in the organizing committee of 18th International Conference on Representations of Algebras (ICRA 2018), held for 250 participants from 34 countries in August 2018 in Prague, Czech Republic.

He has been elected Fellow of the American Mathematical Society (AMS) in 2020, for contributions to homological algebra and tilting theory for non finitely generated modules.

He serves as Member of the Science board for Neuron prize that is awarded to best Czech scientists by Neuron Endowment Fund.

== Selected publications ==
=== Papers ===
- 1994: "Every *-module is finitely generated", Journal of Algebra, 169 (2): 392–398, doi:10.1006/jabr.1994.1291
- 1996: Trlifaj, Jan (1996), "Whitehead test modules", Transactions of the American Mathematical Society, 348 (4): 1521–1554, doi:10.1090/S0002-9947-96-01494-8
- 2001: Eklof, Paul C.; Trlifaj, Jan (2001), "How to make Ext vanish", Bulletin of the London Mathematical Society, 33 (1): 41–51, doi:10.1112/blms/33.1.41, S2CID 11541149 (with Paul C. Eklof), Shelah, Saharon; Trlifaj, Jan (2001), "Spectra of the Γ-invariant of uniform modules", Journal of Pure and Applied Algebra, 162 (2–3): 367–379, arXiv:math/0009060, doi:10.1016/S0022-4049(00)00118-3 (with Saharon Shelah)
- 2007: Šťovíček, Jan; Trlifaj, Jan (2007), "All tilting modules are of countable type", Bulletin of the London Mathematical Society, 39 (1): 121–132, doi:10.1112/blms/bdl019 (with Jan Šťovíček)
- 2012: Herbera, Dolors; Trlifaj, Jan (2012), "Almost free modules and Mittag-Leffler conditions", Advances in Mathematics, 229 (6): 3436–3467, arXiv:0910.4277, doi:10.1016/j.aim.2012.02.013 (with Dolors Herbera), Estrada, Sergio; Guil Asensio, Pedro A.; Prest, Mike; Trlifaj, Jan (2012), "Model category structures arising from Drinfeld vector bundles" (PDF), Advances in Mathematics, 231 (3–4): 1417–1438, doi:10.1016/j.aim.2012.06.011 (with Sergio Estrada, Pedro A. Guil Asensio, and Mike Prest)
- 2014: Angeleri Hügel, Lidia; Pospíšil, David; Šťovíček, Jan; Trlifaj, Jan (2014), "Tilting, cotilting, and spectra of commutative noetherian rings", Transactions of the American Mathematical Society, 366 (7): 3487–3517, arXiv:1203.0907, doi:10.1090/S0002-9947-2014-05904-7 (with Lidia Angeleri Hügel, David Pospíšil, and Jan Šťovíček)
- 2016: Slávik, Alexander; Trlifaj, Jan (2016), "Very flat, locally very flat, and contraadjusted modules", Journal of Pure and Applied Algebra, 220 (12): 3910–3926, arXiv:1601.00783, doi:10.1016/j.jpaa.2016.05.020, S2CID 119176440 (with Alexander Slávik)

=== Books ===
- 2006, 2012: Approximations and Endomorphism Algebras of Modules, de Gruyter Expositions in Mathematics 41, Vol. 1 - Approximations, Vol. 2 - Predictions, W. de Gruyter Berlin - Boston, xxviii + 972 pp. (with Rüdiger Göbel)

== Awards and distinctions ==
- Prize of the Dean of MFF for the best monograph 2006
- MFF UK Silver medal at the Sexagennial anniversary
- Fellow of the American Mathematical Society, 2020
