= Lawrence Mysak =

Canadian mathematician (born 1940)

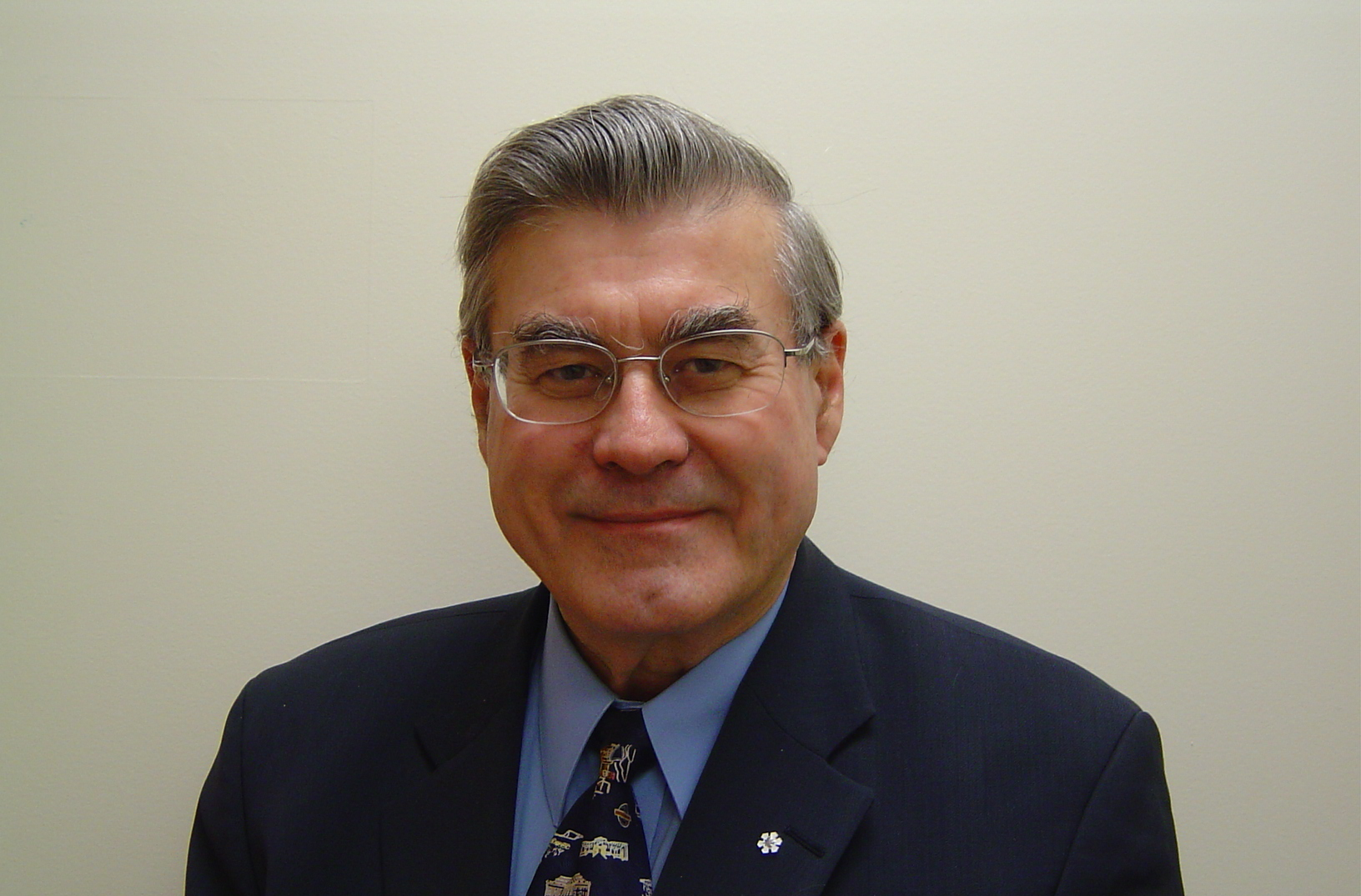
- Lawrence Mysak in 2005
- Born: Lawrence A. Mysak; January 1940 (age 86); Saskatoon, Saskatchewan, Canada
- Education: B.Sc. University of Alberta, M.Sc. University of Adelaide, Ph.D. Harvard University
- Known for: Earth System Modelling, Climate Dynamics, The Little Ice Age
- Awards: See the text
- Scientific career
- Fields: Mathematics
- Workplaces: Harvard University, University of British Columbia and McGill University
- Doctoral advisor: Allan Robinson

Lawrence A. Mysak, CM FRSC (born January 1940) is a Canadian applied mathematician, working primarily on physical oceanography, and climate research, particularly arctic and palaeoclimate research.

== Biography ==
Mysak was born in Saskatoon, Saskatchewan, to Ukrainian parents. He earned his B.Sc. in applied mathematics in 1961 from the University of Alberta (Canada) along with his Assoc. Mus. (flute performance), his M.Sc. from the University of Adelaide in 1963 (where he was supervised by George Szekeres ) and his Ph.D., also in applied mathematics, from Harvard University in 1967. Lawrence continues to play the flute now with the I Medici di McGill orchestra.

Then followed faculty appointments at Harvard University and the University of British Columbia where he co-authored the standard textbook on Waves in the Ocean with Paul LeBlond. Finally he joined the faculty at McGill University from 1986 until his retirement in 2010. At McGill University Mysak was the founding director, in 1990, of the McGill Centre for Global Change Research which is now known as the Global Environment and Climate Change Centre and during his tenure Dr. Mysak served as president of the International Association for the Physical Sciences of the Oceans, IAPSO and serves on the board of trustees of the Canadian Foundation for Climate and Atmospheric Sciences.

Mysak's research focuses on Arctic sea ice and climate during the Little Ice Age; sea ice rheology (viscous-plastic vs. purely plastic models); modeling the freshwater budget of the Arctic Ocean and exchanges with the North Atlantic Ocean (present and past); response of the ocean carbon cycle to Milankovitch forcing in a low-order atmosphere-ocean-sea ice model; and reconstruction of climate change in Europe during the past millennium from an analysis of church architecture, comparing the Medieval Warm Period with the Little Ice Age.

Lawrence Mysak has an Erdős number of 2 as a result of a paper he published with George Szekeres who has an Erdős number of 1 (see List of people by Erdős number).

== Honours ==
- Fellow of the Royal Society of Canada
- Lauréat Prix Acfas Michel-Jurdant, for environmental sciences, 2005
- Member of the Order of Canada (CM)
- Fellow of the Canadian Meteorological and Oceanographic Society (CMOS)
- Fellow of the American Meteorological Society
- Fellow of the American Geophysical Union (AGU)
- Fellow of the International Union of Geodesy and Geophysics.
- Canadian Steamship Lines Professor of Meteorology at McGill University, Canada
- Alfred Wegener Medal, 2006, awarded by the European Geosciences Union to honour a scientist who has achieved exceptional international standing in atmospheric, hydrological or ocean sciences
- Honorary professor of the National University of Kyiv-Mohyla Academy
