= Cecil C. Rousseau =

American mathematician (1938–2020)

Cecil Clyde Rousseau, Jr. (January 13, 1938 Philadelphia - April 10, 2020 Memphis) was a mathematician and author who specialized in graph theory and combinatorics. He was a professor at The University of Memphis starting in 1970 until retiring in 2008, and was involved with USAMO in many capacities, including serving as chair.

Rousseau received his Ph.D. in Physics in 1968 from Texas A&M University.

He has an Erdős number of 1, and is Erdős' 5th most common co-author, with 35 joint papers. He also frequently collaborated with Memphis faculty Ralph Faudree and Dick Schelp.

In 2012, Rousseau received the Paul Erdős Award from the World Federation of National Mathematics Competitions.

To his students and colleagues, he was known affectionately as C²R.
