= Maria Hoffmann-Ostenhof =

Austrian mathematician (born 1947)

Maria Hoffmann-Ostenhof (née Bauer, born 1947) is an Austrian mathematician known for her work on the behavior of the Schrödinger equation, and particularly on its asymptotic analysis, nodal lines, and behavior near its singularities.

Hoffmann-Ostenhof was born on 12 January 1947 in Vienna. She studied mathematics at the University of Vienna, with a year visiting the University of Zurich, and completed her Ph.D. in 1973 at the University of Vienna. Her dissertation, Über Kongruenzverbände universaler Algebren und binärer Systeme [On congruence relations of universal algebras and binary systems] was supervised by Wilfried Nöbauer. During her studies she married another mathematician, Thomas Hoffmann-Ostenhof.

After two years at the Max Planck Institute for Coal Research, she returned to the University of Vienna, where she was employed in various part-time positions. In 1991, she earned a habilitation in mathematics, the first woman at the university to do so; her habilitation thesis was Nullstellen und asymptotisches Verhalten von L2-Lösungen von Schrödingergleichungen [Zeros and asymptotic behavior of L2-solutions of the Schrödinger equation].

She became an associate position at the University of Vienna in 1992, and was given the title of University Professor in 2008. She retired in 2010.
