= Carla Savage =

American computer scientist

Carla Diane Savage is an American computer scientist and mathematician, a professor of computer science at North Carolina State University and a former secretary of the American Mathematical Society (2013-2020).

== Education and research ==
Savage attended high school in Baltimore County, Maryland, where she took advanced classes in mathematics. Savage earned her Ph.D. in 1977 from the University of Illinois at Urbana–Champaign under the supervision of David E. Muller; her thesis concerned parallel graph algorithms. Much of her more recent research has concerned Gray codes and algorithms for efficient generation of combinatorial objects.

== Awards and honors ==
In 2012 she became a fellow of the American Mathematical Society. In 2019 she was named a SIAM Fellow "for outstanding research in algorithms of discrete mathematics and in computer science applications, alongside exemplary service to mathematics".

== Selected publications ==
- Savage, Carla; Ja'Ja', Joseph (1981), "Fast, efficient parallel algorithms for some graph problems", SIAM Journal on Computing, 10 (4): 682–691, doi:10.1137/0210051, MR 0635426, Zbl 0476.68036.
- Savage, Carla (1997), "A survey of combinatorial Gray codes", SIAM Review, 39 (4): 605–629, Bibcode:1997SIAMR..39..605S, doi:10.1137/S0036144595295272, MR 1491049, Zbl 1049.94513.
