= M. G. Nadkarni =

Indian academic

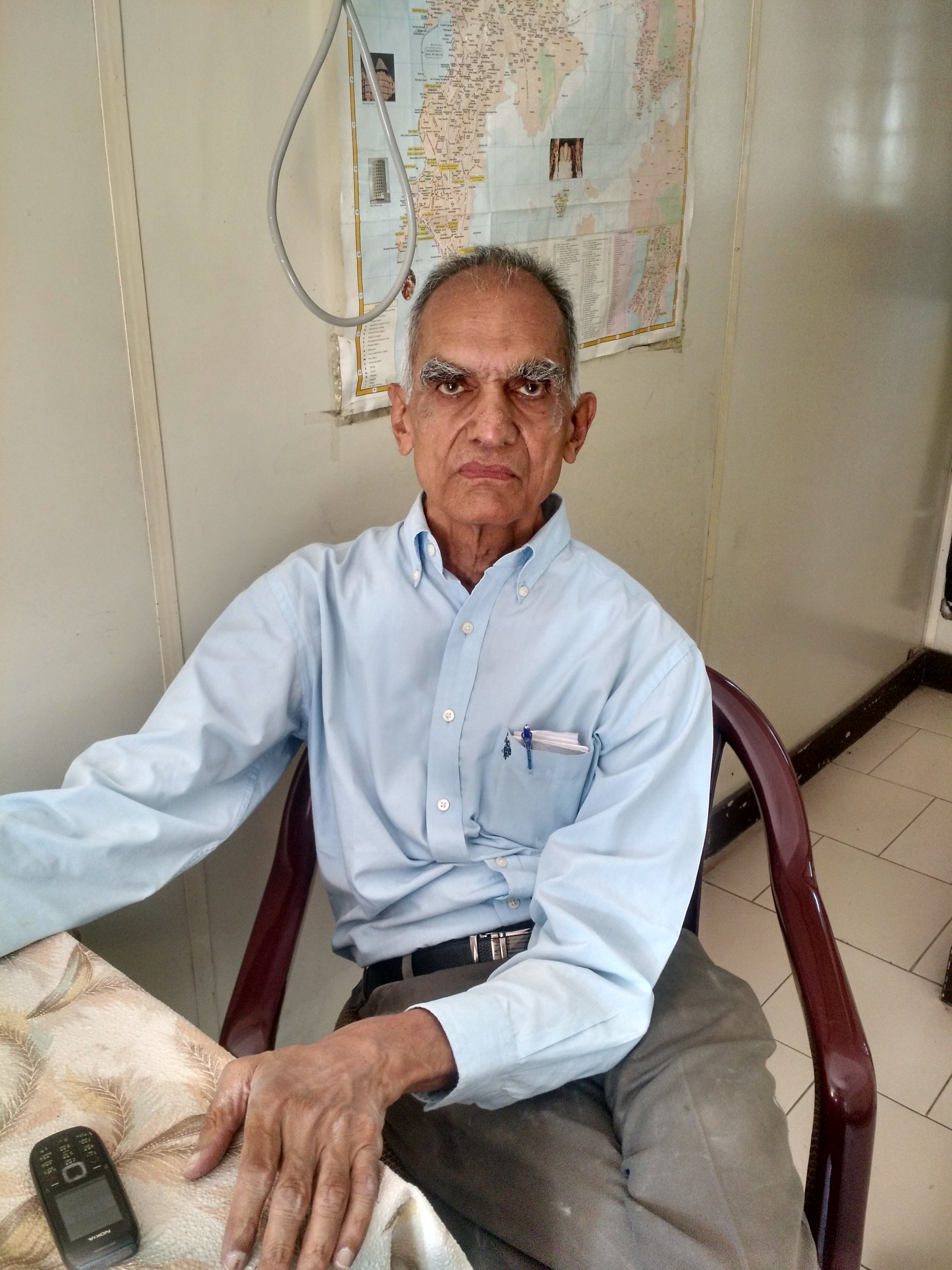
Prof. M.G. Nadkarni

Mahendra G. Nadkarni is a professor emeritus at University of Mumbai. Nadkarni obtained his Ph.D. in mathematics from Brown University, the US in 1964 for his work on Ergodic theory. His research interests include Ergodic Theory, Harmonic Analysis, and Probability Theory.

Nadkarni has taught at Washington University in St. Louis, University of Minnesota, Indian Statistical Institute (ISI), Calcutta University (1968–1981), University of Mumbai (1981–1998), Indian Institute of Technology Indore (2010–2012), and Centre for Excellence in Basic Sciences (2012-present). He teaches Measure Theory, Probability Theory and Stochastic Calculus to undergraduates at CEBS.

He was Head of the Department of Mathematics, at the University of Mumbai. He is a fellow of the Indian National Science Academy as well as the Indian Academy of Sciences. Nadkarni is an author of books on Ergodic theory.

== Selected publications ==
- Basic ergodic theory. New Delhi: Hindustan Book Agency. 1995. ISBN 978-81-85931-07-4.
  - Basic ergodic theory (2nd ed.). Basel; Boston: Birkhäuser Verlag. 1998.
- with Sadanand G. Telang: Number theory. New Delhi: Tata McGraw-Hill. 1996.
- Spectral theory of dynamical systems. Basel; Boston: Birkhäuser Verlag. 1998.
  - Spectral theory of dynamical systems (2nd ed.). New Delhi: Hindustan Book Agency. 2011.
