= Eva Regnier =

American decision scientist (born 1971)

- Education: Massachusetts Institute of Technology; Georgia Institute of Technology
- Title: President of the INFORMS Forum on Women in Operations Research and Management Science

Eva Dorothy Regnier (born 1971) is an American decision scientist whose research concerns the interaction between human decision-making and environmental prediction. She is a professor of decision science in the Graduate School of Business and Public Policy of the Naval Postgraduate School.

== Education and career ==
Regnier graduated from the Massachusetts Institute of Technology in 1992 with a bachelor's degree in environmental engineering science. After working from 1993 to 1996 in industry as an environmental engineer, she went to the Georgia Institute of Technology for a master's degree in operations research in 1999 and a Ph.D. in industrial engineering in 2001. Her dissertation, Discounted Cash Flow Methods and Environmental Decisions, was supervised by Craig Tovey.

She joined the Defense Resources Management Institute of the Naval Postgraduate School in 2001, moved to the Graduate School of Business and Public Policy in 2017, and was promoted to full professor in 2019.

Regnier was president of the INFORMS Forum on Women in Operations Research and Management Science for 2011.

== Contributions ==
Regnier has published well-cited works on volatility in energy markets and on decision-making for evacuations based on hurricane predictions. Other topics in her research include correlations between pirate activity and predicted changes in climate and weather. Her work on hurricane evacuation was a finalist for the INFORMS Junior Faculty Forum award, and her work developing a tool to simulate the hurricane decision-making process was a finalist in the INFORMS MSOM Practice Based Research Competition. She received the INFORMS Decision Analysis Society Publication Award for her work on probability forecasting.
