= Richard Schelp =

American mathematician

Richard H. Schelp (April 21, 1936, Kansas City, Missouri, United States – November 29, 2010, Memphis, Tennessee, USA) was an American mathematician.

Schelp received his bachelor's degree in mathematics and physics from the University of Central Missouri and his master's degree and doctorate in mathematics from Kansas State University. The adviser from his thesis was Richard Joseph Greechie. He was an associate mathematician and missile scientist at Johns Hopkins University for five years. He then became an instructor of mathematics at Kansas State University for four years. Finally in 1970 he became a professor of mathematics in the Department of Mathematical Sciences at the University of Memphis. He retired in 2001.

Schelp, an Erdős number one mathematician, was the fourth most frequent scholarly collaborator with Paul Erdős. He also collaborated on research with another top ten most frequent Erdős collaborator, Ralph Faudree, who was based at the University of Memphis as well.

== See also ==
- List of people by Erdős number
