= Johan Wästlund =

Swedish mathematician

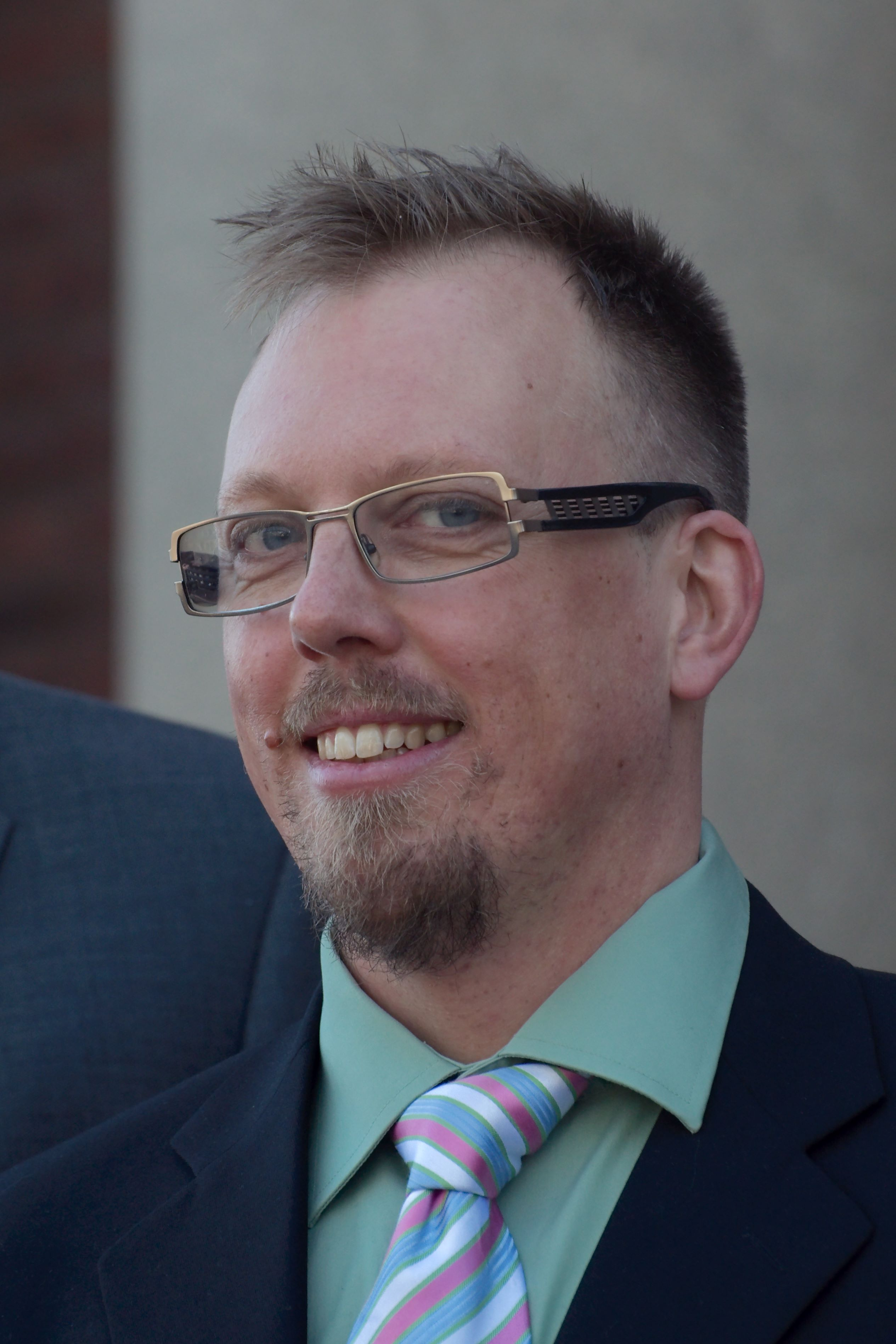
Göran Gustafson prize laureates 2013

Johan Wästlund (born 26 February 1971) is a Swedish mathematician currently at Chalmers University of Technology and, in 2013, was awarded Royal Swedish Academy of Sciences's Göran Gustafsson Prize.
