= Hunter Snevily =

American mathematician and physics professor

- Born: June 15, 1956
- Died: November 11, 2013 (aged 57). Moscow, Idaho
- Education: Emory University; University of Illinois Urbana-Champaign
- Occupation: Mathematician
- Employer: University of Idaho
- Known for: Contributions in Set theory, Graph theory, and Ramsey theory on the integers

Hunter Snevily (1956–2013) was an American mathematician with expertise and contributions in Set theory, Graph theory, Discrete geometry, and Ramsey theory on the integers.

== Education and career ==
Hunter received his undergraduate degree from Emory University in 1981, and his Ph.D. degree from the University of Illinois Urbana-Champaign under the supervision of Douglas West in 1991. After a postdoctoral fellowship at Caltech, where he mentored many students, Hunter took a faculty position at the University of Idaho in 1993 where he was a professor until 2010. He retired early while fighting with Parkinsons, but continued research in mathematics till his last days.

== Mathematics research ==
The following are some of Hunter's most important contributions (as discussed in):

- Hunter formulated a conjecture (1991) bounding the size of a family of sets under intersection constraints. He conjectured that if ${\mathcal L}$ is a set of $k$ positive integers and $\{A_1,A_2,\ldots,A_m\}$ is a family of subsets of an $n$-set satisfying $|A_i \cap A_j| \in {\mathcal L}$ whenever $i \neq j$, then $m \leq \sum_{i=0}^k{n-1 \choose i}$. His conjecture was ambitious in a way it would beautifully unify classical results of Nicolaas Govert de Bruijn and Paul Erdős (1948), Bose (1949), Majumdar (1953), H. J. Ryser (1968), Frankl and Füredi (1981), and Frankl and Wilson (1981). Hunter finally proved his conjecture in 2003
- Hunter made important contribution to the well known Chvátal's Conjecture (1974) which states that every hereditary family ${\mathcal F}$ of sets has a largest intersecting subfamily consisting of sets with a common element. Schönheim proved this when the maximal members of ${\mathcal F}$ have a common element. Vašek Chvátal proved it when there is a linear order on the elements such that $\{b_1,b_2,\ldots,b_k\}\in{\mathcal F}$ implies $\{a_1,a_2,\ldots,a_k\}\in{\mathcal F}$ when $a_i \leq b_i$ for $1 \leq i \leq k$. A family ${\mathcal F}$ has $x$ as a dominant element if substituting $x$ for any element of a member of ${\mathcal F}$ not containing $x$ yields another member of ${\mathcal F}$. Hunter's 1992 result greatly strengthened both Schönheim's result and Chvátal's result by proving the conjecture for all families having a dominant element; it was major progress on the problem.
- One of his most cited papers is with Lior Pachter and Bill Voxman on Graph pebbling. This paper and Hunter's later paper with Foster added several conjectures on the subject and together have been cited in more than 50 papers.
- Hunter made important contributions on the Snake-in-the-box problem and on the Graceful labeling of graphs.
- One of Hunter's conjectures (1999) became known as Snevily's Conjecture: Given an abelian group $G$ of odd order, and subsets $\{a_1,a_2,\ldots,a_k\}$ and $\{b_1,b_2,\ldots,b_k\}$ of $G$, there exists a permutation $\pi$ of $[k]$ such that $a_1+b_{\pi}(1), a_2+b_{\pi}(2), \ldots, a_k+b_{\pi}(k)$ are distinct. Noga Alon proved this for cyclic groups of prime order. Dasgupta et al. (2001). proved it for all cyclic groups. Finally, after a decade, the conjecture was proved for all groups by a young mathematician Arsovski. Terence Tao devoted a section to Snevily's Conjecture in his well-known book Additive Combinatorics.
- Hunter collaborated the most with his long-term friend André Kézdy. After retirement, he became friends with Tanbir Ahmed and explored experimental mathematics that resulted in several publications
