= Hilda Assiyatun =

Indonesian mathematician

- Education: Bandung Institute of Technology (1992); Bandung Institute of Technology (1995); University of Melbourne (PhD, 2002)
- Scientific career
- Fields: mathematics
- Institutions: Bandung Institute of Technology
- Thesis: Large Subgraphs of Regular Graphs (2002)
- Doctoral advisor: Nicholas Charles Wormald

Hilda Assiyatun is an Indonesian mathematician, a professor in the Faculty of Mathematics and Natural Sciences of the Bandung Institute of Technology, the vice president for education and teaching of the Indonesian Mathematical Society (IndoMS), and the president of the Indonesian Combinatorial Society (InaCombS). Her research has concerned graph theory, with topics including graph Ramsey theory, the metric dimension of graphs, and graph coloring.

== Education and career ==
Assiyatun received the equivalent of a bachelor's and master's degree from the Bandung Institute of Technology in 1992 and 1995 respectively. She completed a Ph.D. in Australia in 2002, at the University of Melbourne, with the dissertation Large Subgraphs of Regular Graphs supervised by Nick Wormald. Through her collaborations with Wormald on the paper 3-star factors in random d-regular graphs, she has Erdős number 2.

At the Bandung Institute of Technology, Assiyatun was promoted to full professor in Ramsey theory in 2023, and gave her inaugural lecture as professor in 2024.

== Society leadership ==
Assiyatun has been vice president for education and teaching of the Indonesian Mathematical Society since 2020. After serving as vice president of the Indonesian Combinatorial Society, she was elected president in 2022. Assiyatun is currently serving as president for the 2024–2026 term.

== Selected works ==
- Assiyatun, Hilda; Wormald, Nicholas (November 2006), "3-star factors in random d -regular graphs", European Journal of Combinatorics, 27 (8): 1249–1262, doi:10.1016/j.ejc.2006.05.003
- Saputro, S. W.; Simanjuntak, R.; Uttunggadewa, S.; Assiyatun, H.; Baskoro, E. T.; Salman, A. N. M.; Bača, M. (6 May 2013), "The metric dimension of the lexicographic product of graphs", Discrete Mathematics, 313 (9): 1045–1051, doi:10.1016/j.disc.2013.01.021, ISSN 0012-365X
