= Katalin Hangos =

Hungarian chemical engineer

Katalin M. Hangos is a Hungarian chemical engineer whose research concerns control theory and chemical process modeling. She is a research professor in the Systems and Control Laboratory of the Institute for Computer Science and Control of the Hungarian Academy of Sciences, and a professor of electrical engineering and information systems at the University of Pannonia.

== Education ==
Hangos earned a master's degree in chemistry at Eötvös Loránd University in 1976, and returned to Eötvös Loránd University for a bachelor's degree in computer science in 1980. She earned a Ph.D. in chemical engineering in 1984 and, through the Hungarian Academy of Sciences, a D.Sc. in process systems engineering in 1994.

== Books ==
Hangos is the co-author of:

- Process Modelling and Model Analysis (with Ian T. Cameron, Academic Press, 2001)
- Analysis and Control of Nonlinear Process Systems (with József Bokor and Gábor Szederkényi, Springer, 2004)
- Intelligent Control Systems: An Introduction with Examples (with Rozália Lakner and Miklós Gerzson, Kluwer, 2004)
- Analysis and Control of Polynomial Dynamic Models with Biological Applications (with Gábor Szederkényi and Attila Magyar, Academic Press, 2018)
