= Eric van Douwen =

Dutch mathematician (1946–1987)

Eric Karel van Douwen (April 25, 1946 in Voorburg, South Holland, Netherlands – July 28, 1987 in Athens, Ohio, United States) was a Dutch mathematician specializing in set-theoretic topology. He received his Ph.D. in 1975 from Vrije Universiteit under the supervision of Maarten Maurice and Johannes Aarts, both of whom were in turn students of Johannes de Groot.

He began his academic career studying physics, but became dissatisfied partway through the program. His wife helped inspire his choice to switch to mathematics by asking, "Why not mathematics? It's what you work on all the time anyway". He produced the content of his dissertation unsupervised, and seeking better credentials, he transferred to Vrije to defend, a maneuver permitted by the Dutch university rules.
