= Cristina G. Fernandes =

Brazilian Computer Scientist

Cristina Gomes Fernandes
- Education: University of São Paulo; Georgia Institute of Technology
- Occupation: Computer scientist

Cristina Gomes Fernandes is professor of computer science at the University of São Paulo.

Fernandes has a BSc in computer science from the University of São Paulo (1987), a MSc in Applied Mathematics from the University of São Paulo (1992) and a PhD in computer science from the Georgia Institute of Technology (1997), the title of her thesis was Approximation Algorithms for Planar and Highly Connected Subgraphs.

Her research focus lies in the research of combinatorial optimization, with emphasis on approximation algorithms, algorithm analysis and computational complexity.
