= Brigitte Jaumard =

Computer scientist

Brigitte Jaumard is a computer scientist and expert on mathematical programming. She earned a doctorate in 1986 from ENST, today ParisTech under the supervision of Michel Minoux. She was a professor at Polytechnique Montréal. from 1989 until 2000. She is now a professor in the department of computer science and software engineering at Concordia University, where she is the holder of an Honorary Concordia Research Chair in Optimization of Communication Networks.
