= Valéria Neves Domingos Cavalcanti =

Brazilian mathematician

Valéria Neves Domingos Cavalcanti (born 1965) is a Brazilian mathematician whose research has concerned the control and stabilization of partial differential equations, and especially damping in viscoelastic systems. She is a professor in the department of mathematics at the State University of Maringá.

Domingos Cavalcanti was born in Rio de Janeiro on 19 February 1965, the daughter of Portuguese immigrants to Brazil; she grew up in Vila da Penha. A good all-around student, she chose to study mathematics when she took the entrance examination for the Federal University of Rio de Janeiro, where she received a bachelor's degree in 1986, a master's degree in 1988, and a doctorate in 1995. Her doctoral dissertation, Comportamento Assintótico do Sistema de Elasticidade, was supervised by Manuel A. Milla Miranda. She joined the State University of Maringá as an associate professor in 1989, and became a full professor in 2017.

She has headed the Paraná Mathematical Society twice, and is a member of the board of directors of the Brazilian Mathematical Society.
