= Sandra Mitchell Hedetniemi =

American mathematician and computer scientist

Sandra Lee "Sandee" Mitchell Hedetniemi (née Mitchell; born July 5, 1949) is an American mathematician and computer scientist, known for her research in graph theory and algorithms on graphs. She is a professor of computer science at Clemson University.

== Education and career ==
Hedetniemi majored in applied mathematics at Centre College in Kentucky, graduating in 1971. She completed a Ph.D. in computer science in 1977 at the University of Virginia under the supervision of Stephen T. Hedetniemi. Her dissertation was Algorithms on Trees and Maximal Outerplanar Graphs: Design, Complexity Analysis, and Data Structures Study.

She joined the University of Louisville faculty as an instructor in applied mathematics and computer science 1973, and became an assistant professor there in 1975. She moved to the department of computer and information science at the University of Oregon in 1978, and was given tenure there in 1981. In 1982 she moved again to Clemson University, taking a half-time position as an associate professor of computer science, and she was promoted to full professor in 1994.

== Personal life ==
Hedetniemi is originally from Louisville, Kentucky; her father, Wilber A. Mitchell, was a US Navy veteran, psychiatrist, and hospital administrator. She married Stephen T. Hedetniemi, her former advisor, in 1979, when both were faculty members at the University of Oregon.
