= Stephen T. Hedetniemi =

American mathematician and computer scientist

Stephen T. Hedetniemi (7 February 1939) is an American mathematician and computer scientist specializing in graph theory. He is professor emeritus of computer science at Clemson University.

== Biography ==
Hedetniemi graduated from the University of Michigan with a bachelor's degree in mathematics in 1960, a master's degree in 1962, and a doctorate in communication sciences in 1966 with Frank Harary. He was in the Computational Logic Group at the University of Michigan and became assistant professor in Computer Science at the University of Iowa in 1967 and associate professor in 1969. From 1972 he was an associate professor at the University of Virginia. In 1972 he spent two months at the Naval Weapons Laboratory in Dahlgren and in 1975/76 he was a visiting professor at the University of Victoria. From 1977 to 1982, he was a professor and head of the Department of Computer Science at the University of Oregon. From 1982 he was a professor at Clemson University.

== Selected publications ==
- Homomorphisms of Graphs and Automata, University of Michigan Communications Sciences Program, Technical Report 03105-44-T, 1966 (PhD thesis) MR2615860
- Fundamentals of Domination in Graphs, with Teresa W. Haynes & Peter Slater, Marcel Dekker, 1998
- Structures of Domination in Graphs, co-edited with Teresa W. Haynes & Michael A. Henning, Springer, 2021
- Domination in Graphs: Core Concepts, with Teresa W. Haynes & Michael A. Henning, Springer, 2023
