= Joanne Moldenhauer =

American mathematician

Joanne K. Moldenhauer (née Gatz, March 15, 1928 – February 14, 2016) was an American high school mathematics teacher and two-time winner of the Edyth May Sliffe Award.

== Education ==
Moldenhauer's father served in the United States Army. She was born in Omaha, Nebraska, and attended Benson High School in Omaha. She graduated in 1949 from the Iowa State College, with a degree in physics, hoping to go on to a research career in physics was but blocked from that goal because there were few places for women in physics at the time.

== Career ==
After graduating from Iowa State, Moldenhauer became a high school mathematics teacher in Omaha, and two years later became a student again at the University of Minnesota. She completed a master's degree in mathematics at Minnesota in 1952, and started work as an electrical engineer at General Electric. Her job there involved the development of fire-control systems for military aircraft. However, bored with her work, she soon returned to high school teaching. In 1955 she became a high school teacher in Schenectady, New York, where she had been working for General Electric, and in 1956 she moved to Davis Senior High School in Davis, California.

After 50 years as a teacher in Davis, Moldenhauer retired in 2006.

== Contributions and recognition ==
Moldenhauer won the Edyth May Sliffe Award for Distinguished High School Mathematics Teaching of the Mathematical Association of America twice, in 1990 and 2001. She was also a winner of Stanford University's Frederick Emmons Terman Engineering Award, given annually by the graduating engineering students at Stanford to a distinguished high school teacher. She was a two-time winner of Harvey Mudd College's Distinguished Teaching Award. Unusually for a high school mathematics teacher, Moldenhauer has an Erdős number of 2, from her collaboration with mathematician Sherman K. Stein and mechanical engineer Anthony S. Wexler on "Trigonometry and a Wood Bowl".
