= Klaus Sutner =

American computer scientist

Klaus Sutner is a Teaching Professor of Computer Science at Carnegie Mellon University, and is also a former Associate Dean of Undergraduate Programs for the Carnegie Mellon School of Computer Science. His research interests include cellular automata, discrete mathematics as pertains to computation, and computational complexity theory. He developed a hybrid Mathematica/C++ application named Automata that manipulates finite-state machines and their syntactic semigroups. He "has survived five decades in the martial arts. Barely." and is the head instructor at the Three-Rivers Aikikai.
