= Longin Jan Latecki =

Computer Science Professor in USxA

Longin Jan Latecki is a professor of computer science at Temple University, Philadelphia. His research interests encompass computer vision, natural language processing, machine learning, data mining, and digital geometry.

== Education and early career ==
Latecki earned a Master of Science degree in Mathematics with highest honors from the University of Gdańsk in 1985. He later obtained a Doctor of Philosophy in Computer Science from the University of Hamburg, Germany, in 1992, followed by a habilitation in computer science in 1996.

== Research contributions ==
Latecki has contributed to shape-based object recognition and robot perception.

His research in digital geometry is encapsulated in his book, Discrete Representation of Spatial Objects in Computer Vision, published by Kluwer Academic Publishers in 1998.

== Professional service ==
Latecki serves as the Associate Editor-in-Chief of Pattern Recognition. He is also a member of the editorial board for Computer Vision and Image Understanding. Additionally, he sits on the advisory board of the Journal of Imaging.

He has been actively involved in organizing academic conferences, serving as the chair of the SPIE Conference on Vision Geometry XV in 2007.

== Awards and honors ==
Latecki was awarded the 2000 Olympus Prize, the primary annual award of the German Society for Pattern Recognition (DAGM).

In 2018, he received the Amazon Research Award for his work in image search with target object detection.
