= András P. Huhn =

Hungarian mathematician

András P Huhn
- Born: 26 January 1947; Szeged, Hungary
- Died: 6 June 1985 (aged 38); Szeged, Hungary
- Education: József Attila University
- Known for: Huhn's theorem
- Scientific career
- Fields: Mathematics
- Workplaces: József Attila University

András P Huhn (Szeged, 26 January 1947 – Szeged, 6 June 1985) was a Hungarian mathematician. Huhn's theorem on the representation of distributive semilattices is named after him.
