= Ralph Faudree =

Ralph Jasper Faudree (August 23, 1939 – January 13, 2015) was a mathematician, a professor of mathematics and the former provost of the University of Memphis.

Faudree was born in Durant, Oklahoma. He did his undergraduate studies at Oklahoma Baptist University, graduating in 1961, and received his Ph.D. in 1964 from Purdue University under the supervision of Eugene Schenkman (1922–1977). Faudree was an instructor at the University of California, Berkeley and an assistant professor at the University of Illinois before joining the Memphis State University faculty as an associate professor in 1971. Memphis State became renamed as the University of Memphis in 1994, and Faudree was appointed as provost in 2001.

Faudree specialized in combinatorics, and specifically in graph theory and Ramsey theory. He published more than 200 mathematical papers on these topics together with such notable mathematicians as Béla Bollobás, Stefan Burr, Paul Erdős, Ron Gould, András Gyárfás, Brendan McKay, Cecil Rousseau, Richard Schelp, Miklós Simonovits, Joel Spencer, and Vera Sós. He was the 2005 recipient of the Euler Medal for his contributions to combinatorics. His Erdős number was 1: he cowrote 50 joint papers with Paul Erdős beginning in 1976 and was among the three mathematicians who most frequently co-authored with Erdős.

== Selected publications ==
- Faudree, R. J. (1966). "Subgroups of the multiplicative group of a division ring". Trans. Amer. Math. Soc. 124: 41–48. doi:10.1090/s0002-9947-1966-0201508-9. MR 0201508.
- Faudree, R. (1967). "Embedding theorems for ascending nilpotent groups". Proc. Amer. Math. Soc. 18: 148–154. doi:10.1090/s0002-9939-1967-0206105-3. MR 0206105.
- Faudree, Ralph (1968). "A note on the automorphism group of a p-group". Proc. Amer. Math. Soc. 19 (6): 1379–1382. doi:10.1090/s0002-9939-1968-0248224-2. MR 0248224.
- Faudree, R. J. (1969). "Locally finite and solvable groups of sfields". Proc. Amer. Math. Soc. 22 (2): 407–413. doi:10.1090/s0002-9939-1969-0244310-2. MR 0244310.
- Faudree, R. (1971). "Groups in which each element commutes with its endomorphic images". Proc. Amer. Math. Soc. 27 (2): 236–240. doi:10.1090/s0002-9939-1971-0269737-3. MR 0269737.
