= Jennifer Mueller =

American mathematician

Jennifer L. Mueller is an applied mathematician and biomedical engineer whose research concerns inverse problems and their applications, particularly to problems in medical imaging related to electrical impedance tomography. She is a professor of mathematics at Colorado State University, where she also holds a joint appointment in the school of biomedical engineering and the department of electrical and computer engineering.

== Education and career ==
Mueller completed a Ph.D. in 1997 at the University of Nebraska–Lincoln. Her dissertation, Inverse Problems in Singular Differential Equations, was supervised by Thomas S. Shores. After postdoctoral research at the Rensselaer Polytechnic Institute she joined the Colorado State Mathematics Department in 2000, and became a founding member of the School of Biomedical Engineering in 2007. She was promoted to full professor in 2011.

== Book ==
With Samuli Siltanen, Mueller is the author of the book Linear and Nonlinear Inverse Problems with Practical Applications (SIAM, 2012).
