= Margit Voigt =

German mathematician

Margit Voigt is a German mathematician specializing in graph theory and graph coloring. She is a professor of operations research at the University of Applied Sciences Dresden.

Voigt completed her Ph.D. in 1992 at the Technische Universität Ilmenau. Her dissertation, Über die chromatische Zahl einer speziellen Klasse unendlicher Graphen [On the chromatic number of a special class of infinite graphs] was jointly supervised by Rainer Bodendiek and Hansjoachim Walther.

Her results include the first known planar graph that requires five colors for list coloring, and a counterexample to a related conjecture that list coloring of planar graphs requires at most one more color than graph coloring for the same graphs.
