= Sofia Olhede =

British-Swedish mathematical statistician

Sofia Charlotta Olhede
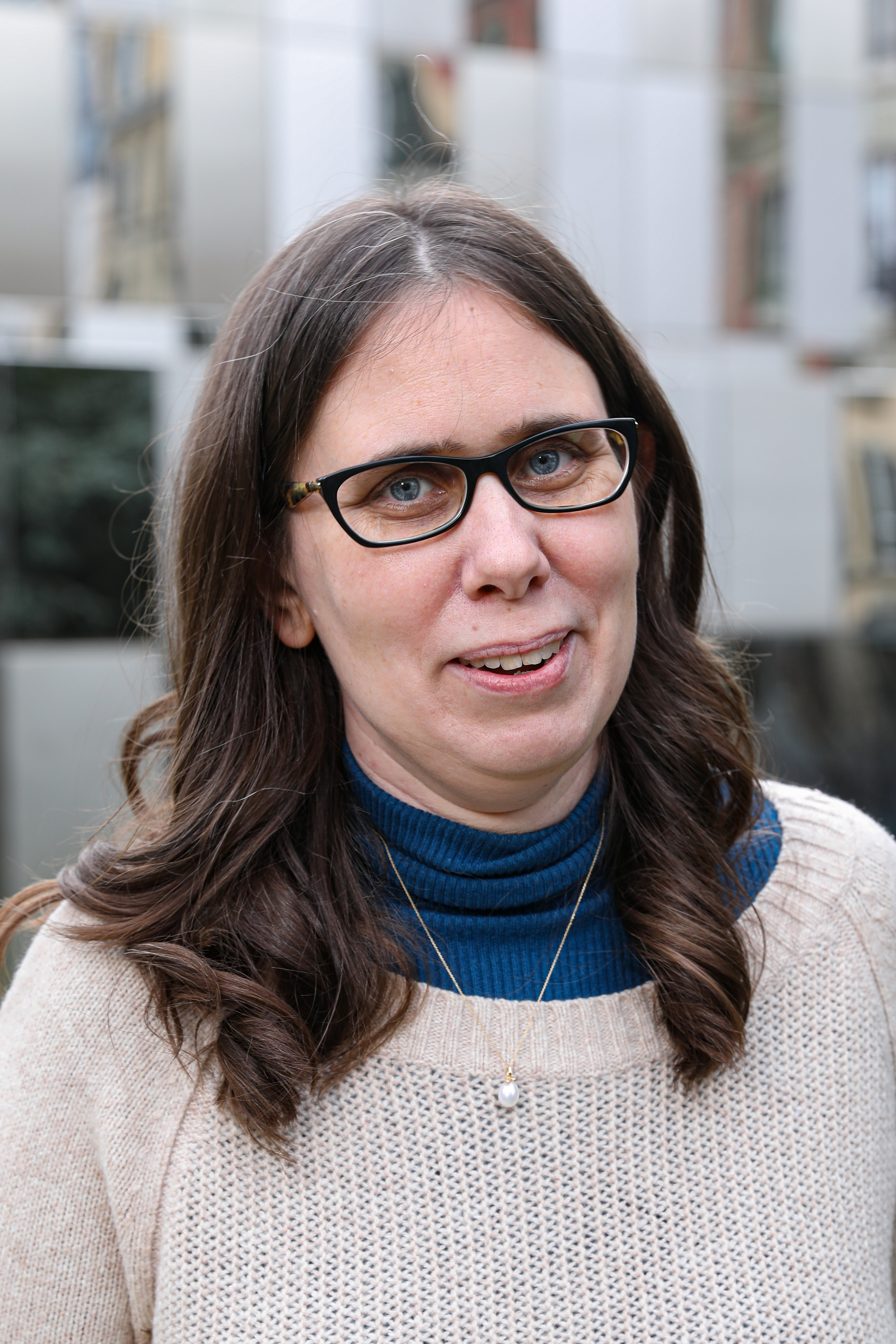
- Olhede in 2021
- Born: 1977 (age 48–49)
- Known for: Wavelets; Graphons; High-dimensional statistics

Academic background
- Education: Mathematics at Imperial College London
- Thesis: Analysis via Time, Frequency and Scale of Nonstationary Signals (2003)
- Doctoral advisor: Andrew T. Walden

Academic work
- Discipline: Mathematics
- Sub-discipline: Mathematical statistics
- Institutions: EPFL (École Polytechnique Fédérale de Lausanne)
- Website: https://www.epfl.ch/labs/sds/

Sofia Charlotta Olhede (born 1977) is a British-Swedish mathematical statistician known for her research on wavelets, graphons, and high-dimensional statistics and for her columns on algorithmic bias. She is a professor of statistical science at the EPFL (École Polytechnique Fédérale de Lausanne).

== Education and career ==
Olhede earned a master's degree from Imperial College London in 2000, and completed her doctorate there in 2003. Her dissertation, Analysis via Time, Frequency and Scale of Nonstationary Signals, was supervised by Andrew T. Walden.

She began her academic career as a lecturer in statistics at Imperial in 2002, and moved to University College London as a professor in 2007. At University College London, she was also an honorary professor of computer science and an honorary senior research associate in mathematics. She became a professor at the Chair of Statistical Data Science at EPFL in 2019.

She was also a member of the Public Policy Commission of the Law Society of England and Wales, and served as university liaison director for University College London at the Alan Turing Institute for 2015–2016.

== Research ==
Her scientific work includes non-parametric function regression, high dimensional time series and point process analysis, and network data analysis.

== Recognition ==
Olhede won an Engineering and Physical Sciences Research Council Leadership Fellowship in 2010, and an ERC consolidator fellowship in 2016. She was elected as a fellow of the Institute of Mathematical Statistics in 2018 "for seminal contributions to the theory and application of large and heterogeneous networks, random fields and point process, for advancing research in data science, and for service to the profession through editorial and committee work".

== Selected works ==
- Janson, Svante; Olhede, Sofia (2021). "Can smooth graphons in several dimensions be represented by smooth graphons on $[0,1]$?". arXiv:2101.07587 [math.CO].
- Sykulski, Adam M.; Olhede, Sofia C.; Guillaumin, Arthur P.; Lilly, Jonathan M.; Early, Jeffrey J. (2019). "The debiased Whittle likelihood". Biometrika. 106 (2): 251–266. arXiv:1605.06718. doi:10.1093/biomet/asy071. hdl:10044/1/98074.
- Lunagómez, Simón; Olhede, Sofia C.; Wolfe, Patrick J. (2020). "Modeling Network Populations via Graph Distances". Journal of the American Statistical Association. 116 (536): 1–18. arXiv:1904.07367. doi:10.1080/01621459.2020.1763803. S2CID 119310085.
- Maugis, P.-A. G.; Olhede, S. C.; Priebe, C. E.; Wolfe, P. J. (2020). "Testing for Equivalence of Network Distribution Using Subgraph Counts". Journal of Computational and Graphical Statistics. 29 (3): 455–465. arXiv:1701.00505. doi:10.1080/10618600.2020.1736085. S2CID 201049943.
