= Kathryn E. Hare =

Canadian mathematician

- Born: 1959 (age 66–67)
- Education: University of Waterloo (BMath); University of British Columbia (PhD)
- Scientific career
- Fields: Mathematics
- Workplaces: University of Waterloo
- Thesis: Thin Sets and Strict-Two-Associatedness (1986)
- Doctoral advisor: John Fournier

Kathryn Elizabeth Hare (born 1959) is a Canadian mathematician specializing in harmonic analysis and fractal geometry. She was the Chair of the Pure Mathematics Department at the University of Waterloo from 2014 to 2018. She retired from the University of Waterloo in 2021.

== Education and career ==
Hare did her undergraduate studies at the University of Waterloo, graduating in 1981. She earned a Ph.D. from the University of British Columbia in 1986. Her dissertation, under the supervision of John J. F. Fournier, was Thin Sets and Strict-Two-Associatedness, and concerned group representation theory.

She was an assistant professor at the University of Alberta from 1986 to 1988, before she moved back to Waterloo.

== Awards and recognition ==
In 2011, the Chalmers University of Technology awarded her an Honorary Doctorate for her "prominent research, both in extent and depth, within classical and abstract harmonic analysis". In 2020 she was named as a Fellow of the Canadian Mathematical Society.

== Selected publications ==
- Hare, Kathryn E.; Klemes, Ivo (1995), "On permutations of lacunary intervals", Transactions of the American Mathematical Society, 347 (10): 4105–4127, doi:10.2307/2155216, JSTOR 2155216.
- Graham, Colin C.; Hare, Kathryn E. (2013), Interpolation and Sidon Sets for Compact Groups, CMS Books in Mathematics/Ouvrages de Mathématiques de la SMC, Springer, New York, doi:10.1007/978-1-4614-5392-5, ISBN 978-1-4614-5391-8.
- Hare, Kathryn E.; He, Jimmy. (2017), "The absolute continuity of convolution products of orbital measures in exceptional symmetric spaces", Monatshefte für Mathematik, 182 (3): 619–635, arXiv:1511.05799, doi:10.1007/s00605-016-0999-5.
