= Ming-Jun Lai =

American mathematician

Ming-Jun Lai is an American mathematician, currently a professor of mathematics at the University of Georgia. His area of research is splines and their numerical analysis. He has published a text on splines called Splines Functions on Triangulations. He was born in Hangzhou, China.

Lai received a B.Sc. from Hangzhou University and a Ph.D. in mathematics from the Texas A&M University in 1989. His dissertation was entitled "On Construction of Bivariate and Trivariate Vertex Splines on Arbitrary Mixed Grid Partitions" and supervised by Charles K. Chui.
