= Bernadette Charron-Bost =

French computer scientist

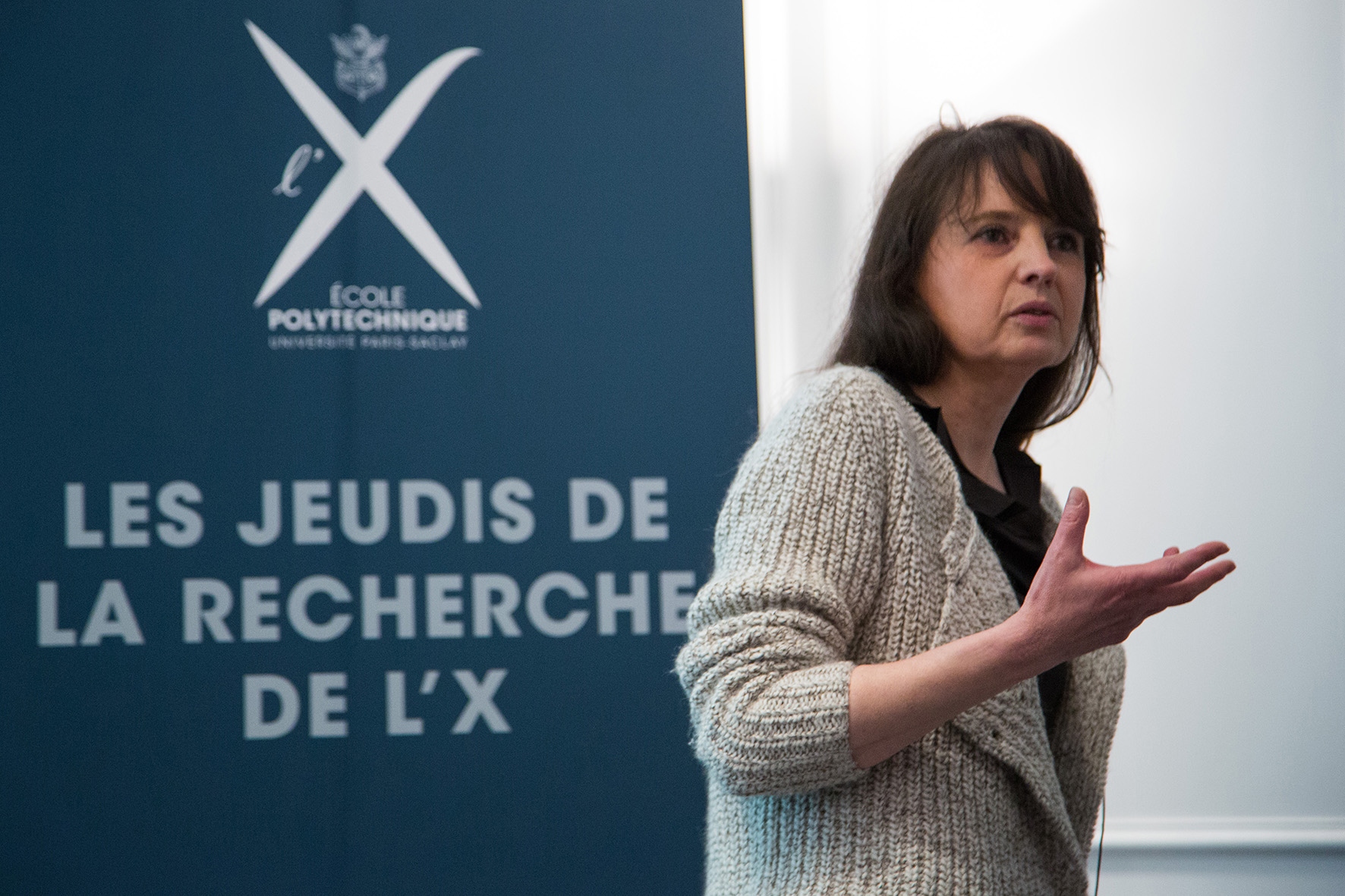
Charron-Bost in 2015

Bernadette Charron-Bost is a French computer scientist specializing in distributed computing. She is a director of research for the French National Centre for Scientific Research (CNRS). Formerly affiliated with the École polytechnique, she recently moved to the École normale supérieure (Paris).

Charron-Bost was the 2019 winner of the Huy Duong Bui grand prize of the French Academy of Sciences.

== Selected publications ==
- Charron-Bost, Bernadette; Mattern, Friedemann; Tel, Gerard (February 1996), "Synchronous, asynchronous, and causally ordered communication", Distributed Computing, 9 (4): 173–191, doi:10.1007/s004460050018
- Chandra, Tushar Deepak; Hadzilacos, Vassos; Toueg, Sam; Charron-Bost, Bernadette (May 1996), "On the impossibility of group membership", in Burns, James E.; Moses, Yoram (eds.), Proceedings of the Fifteenth Annual ACM Symposium on Principles of Distributed Computing (PODC 1996), pp. 322–330, doi:10.1145/248052.248120, hdl:1813/7205
- Basu, Anindya; Charron-Bost, Bernadette; Toueg, Sam (October 1996), "Simulating reliable links with unreliable links in the presence of process crashes", in Babaoglu, Özalp; Marzullo, Keith (eds.), Proceedings of the 10th International Workshop on Distributed Algorithms (WDAG 1996), Lecture Notes in Computer Science, vol. 1151, Springer, pp. 105–122, doi:10.1007/3-540-61769-8_8
- Charron-Bost, Bernadette; Schiper, André (April 2004), "Uniform consensus is harder than consensus" (PDF), Journal of Algorithms, 51 (1): 15–37, doi:10.1016/j.jalgor.2003.11.001
- Charron-Bost, Bernadette; Schiper, André (April 2009), "The Heard-Of model: computing in distributed systems with benign faults" (PDF), Distributed Computing, 22 (1): 49–71, doi:10.1007/s00446-009-0084-6
- Charron-Bost, Bernadette; Pedone, Fernando; Schiper, André, eds. (2010), Replication: Theory and Practice, Lecture Notes in Computer Science, vol. 5959, Springer, doi:10.1007/978-3-642-11294-2, ISBN 978-3-642-11293-5
