= Peter Salamon =

American mathematician

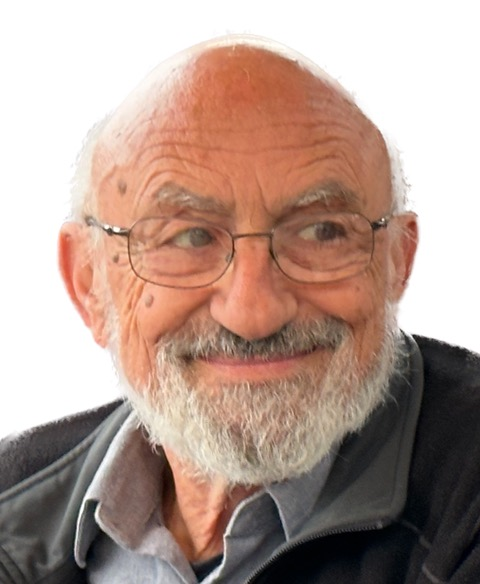
- Education: University of Chicago
- Scientific career
- Fields: Mathematics, Chemistry, Physics
- Workplaces: San Diego State University
- Thesis: The Thermodynamic Legendre Transform or How to Observe the Inside of a Black Box (1978)
- Website: https://salamon.sdsu.edu/

Peter Salamon is an American mathematician and emeritus professor at the Department of Mathematics and Statistics at San Diego State University.

== Early life and education ==
Salamon emigrated with his family from Hungary to the United States at the age of ten. He grew up in Chicago and attended the University of Chicago, where he obtained a PhD in chemistry in the research group of R. Stephen Berry.

Previously, in 1971, he earned a B.A. in mathematics from Lindenwood College and an M.S. in mathematics from Drexel University in 1972.

== Career ==
In 1984, Salamon co-founded the Telluride Science and Innovation Centre, together with R. Stephen Berry. Salamon served as Telluride Science's first chairman of the board and president from 1984 through 1987.

Salamon has been affiliated with San Diego State University since 1980. He has also held visiting positions at Tel Aviv University, the University of Copenhagen, the University of Heidelberg, the Hebrew University and a few other institutions.

== Research work ==
Salamon has published mathematical articles related to biomathematics, thermodynamics in finite time, geometrical thermodynamics, optimization and mathematical modeling. He has an Erdős number of one and has written a book on finite time thermodynamic. Most of Salamon's work deal with optimal control of thermodynamic processes in finite time. Salamon, along with other authors presented the first metagenomic analyses of an uncultured viral community from 200 gallons of seawater using partial shotgun sequencing. In 1990, Salamon introduced the idea of using ensembles of neural networks.

== Selected publications ==
- Salamon, Peter; Erdős, Paul (June 1988). "The Solution to a Problem of Grünbaum". Canadian Mathematical Bulletin. 31 (2): 129–138. doi:10.4153/CMB-1988-020-2.
- Berry, R. Stephen; Salamon, Peter; Andresen, Bjarne (September 2022). Finite-Time Thermodynamics. MDPI Books. ISBN 978-3-0365-4949-1.
- Hansen, Lars Kai; Salamon, Peter (1990). "Neural network ensembles". IEEE Transactions on Pattern Analysis and Machine Intelligence. 12 (10): 993–1001. Bibcode:1990ITPAM..12..993H. doi:10.1109/34.58871.Salamon, Peter; Sibani, Paolo; Frost, Richard (2002). Facts, Conjectures, and Improvements for Simulated Annealing. Society for Industrial and Applied Mathematics. ISBN 978-0-89871-508-8.
- Breitbart, Mya; Salamon, Peter; Andresen, Bjarne; Mahaffy, Joseph M.; Segall, Anca M.; Mead, David; Azam, Farooq; Rohwer, Forest (2002). "Genomic analysis of uncultured marine viral communities". PNAS. 99 (22): 14250–14255. Bibcode:2002PNAS...9914250B. doi:10.1073/pnas.202488399. PMC 137870. PMID 12384570.
