= Joseph Kouneiher =

French mathematical physicist

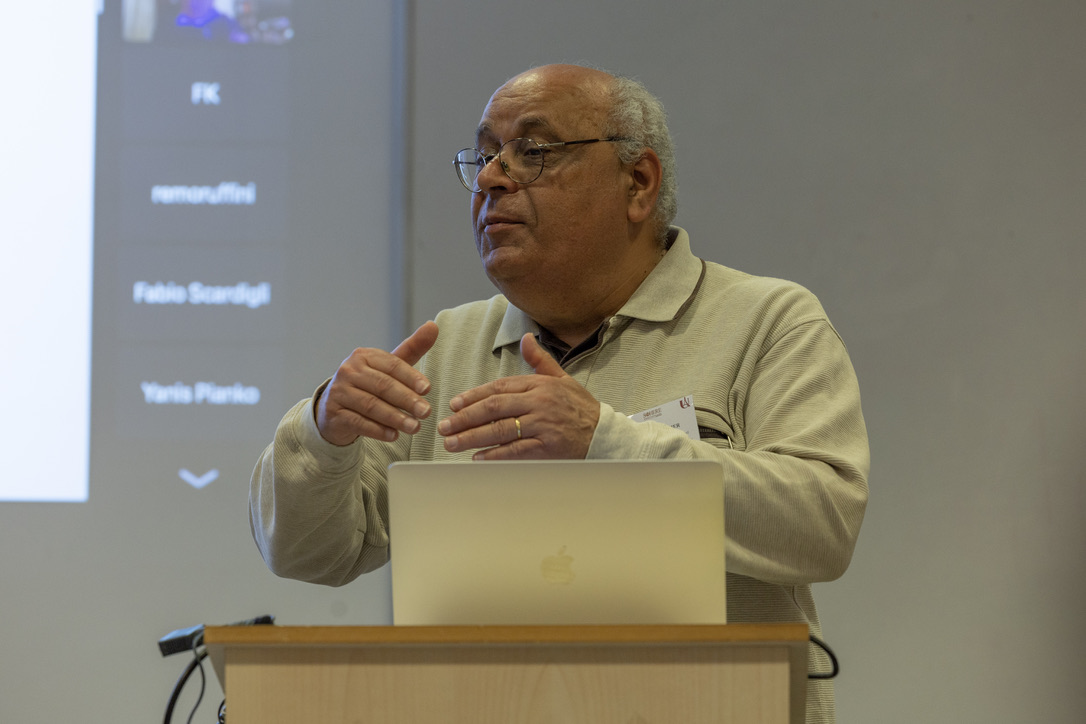
- Born: 8 August 1963; France
- Website: https://scholar.google.fr/citations?user=9-0vJ4gAAAAJ&hl=en

Joseph Kouneiher is a French mathematical physicist. He is a professor of mathematical physics and engineering sciences at Nice SA University, France. He works primarily on the foundations of science, and his work in the domains of quantum field theory, quantum gravity, string theory and conformal field theory is widely cited and is well known. He holds three PhDs in mathematical physics and Epistemology and history of sciences.

== Research work ==
He developed and generalized (with his colleague Frédéric Hélein) Hermann Weyl's Hamiltonian formalism for quantum fields theories, what we call today a Covariant Hamiltonian formalism for the calculus of variations with several variables. The main purpose is to build a hamiltonian theory of fields which is consistent with the principles of relativity. It's a finite dimension formalism for a quantum theories. He also clarified the topological (or cohomological) aspect of certain approach to quantum gravity and the role of the integrability in the foundations of such theories.

In addition to his contributions in mathematical physics, he introduced the cohomological aspect of the mathematical logic theories or what we call now cohomological logic. The aim of the program of "cohomological logic" is to generalize the foundations of the usual theories of logic and connect logic with homotopy theory by introducing a Hopf structure into the generalized logic theories through a geometric approach. This formalism has a great impact on the foundations of some representations of quantum theories

His collaborations with Michael Atiyah to figure out a geometric model for matter. Starting from the idea of an ultimate granular structure of the space-time, which generalizes the continuum and the discontinuum aspects of the space-time, he developed a formalism which generalizes the differential equations and difference equations theories to treat such spaces that appear continuous at low energies and exhibit a dual continuum and discontinuum aspects at high energy.

Apart from his deep-routed interests in foundational sciences, he is also an aficionado of classical music. He composes musical pieces and plays piano among many other instruments.

== Archimedes S.I.E.E. ==
Along with several leading figures, Joseph is the co-founder of the Foundation Archimedes to promote sciences, innovation, education and environment.

The scientific committee includes Sir Roger Penrose, Alain Connes, Simon Donaldson, Mathilde Marcolli, Hugo Duminil-Copin, Misha Gromov, Abhay Ashtekar, Carlo Rovelli, Jeremy Butterfield, Jean-Pierre Luminet, Abhay Ashtekar, Alicia Dickenstein, Jean-Pierre Bourguignon and Sir Michael Atiyah.

Located in Saint-Raphaël, Var, provides interdisciplinary research residencies for both French and international researchers, entrepreneurs, and industrialists. Its facilities are designed to promote focus and creativity, offering opportunities for both individual and small group study stays. The Foundation supports work across a broad range of disciplines, including Industrial Sciences, Technologies, and Environmental Studies.

A key mission of the Foundation is to host prominent scientists, entrepreneurs, and industrialists whose contributions have advanced understanding of the physical world and humanity, as well as driven technological and cultural innovations. The goal is to foster high-level research and innovation across various fields.

== Books authored/co-authored/edited ==
- J. Kouneiher ed., Foundations of Mathematics and Physics, one century after Hilbert, in collaboration with : John Stachel, Michael Atiyah, Alain Connes, Misha Gromov, Roger Penrose, Edward Witten, Ali Chamsddine, Colin Maclarty, Jeremy Butterfield, Abhay Ashtekar, Lee Smolin, Leo Corry, Thierry Masson, Sebastian de Haro, Matilde Marcolli, Springer, 2018.
- J. Kouneiher, Géométrie au XXe siècle : Histoire et horizons, with Dominique Flament, Philippe Nabonand, Jean Jacques Szczeciniarz, éditions Hermann (pour l’Europe) et Presses internationales Polytechnique (USA, Canada), 2005.
- J. Kouneiher, C. Barbachoux, and F. Helein, Geometry, Topology, Quantum Fields Theory and Cosmology, Hermann editions.
- H. Cartan and J. Kouneiher (préface & dernier chapitre), Cours de calcul différentiel, éditions Hermann, 2006.
- J. Kouneiher & al, Fundamental Frontier of Physics, AIP USA, 2012.
- P. Baird, J. Kouneiher & al, Systèmes intégrables & théorie des champs quantiques, Hermann editions, 2007.
- J. Kouneiher, Vers une nouvelle Philosophie de la Nature : Actualités Mathématiques, Physiques et Biologiques, Hermann eds., 2010.
