= Andréa W. Richa =

Brazilian-American computer scientist

Andréa Werneck Richa is a Brazilian-American computer scientist known for her research in distributed computing, self-organizing particle systems, network routing and replication, and bio-inspired computing. She is a President's Professor of computer science and engineering at Arizona State University.

== Education and career ==
Richa studied computer science at the Federal University of Rio de Janeiro, earning a bachelor's degree there in 1989 and a master's degree in 1992. She went to Carnegie Mellon University for advanced graduate study in the program in algorithms, combinatorics, and optimization, earning a second master's degree in 1995 and completing her Ph.D. there in 1998. Her dissertation, On Distributed Network Resource Allocation, was supervised by Bruce Maggs.

She joined Arizona State University as an assistant professor in 1998, earned tenure there as an associate professor in 2004, and was promoted to full professor in 2016.
