= Teresa W. Haynes =

American mathematician

Teresa W. Haynes (born 1953) is an American professor of mathematics and statistics at East Tennessee State University known for her research in graph theory and particularly on dominating sets.

== Education and career ==
Haynes earned three degrees from Eastern Kentucky University: a B.S. in mathematics and education in 1975, M.A. in mathematics and education in 1978, and M.S. in mathematical sciences in 1984. She completed her Ph.D. in computer science in 1988 from the University of Central Florida. Her dissertation was On $k$-$\gamma$-Insensitive Domination and was supervised by Robert C. Brigham.

Haynes worked as a mathematics teacher from 1975 to 1978 and as a telephone engineer from 1978 to 1981. She became a mathematics and computer science instructor at Pikeville College in 1981, and moved to Prestonburg Community College in 1983. After completing her doctorate in 1988, she became an assistant professor at East Tennessee State, and she was promoted to full professor there in 1999.

== Books ==
Haynes is the author of two books on dominating sets in graph theory:

- Haynes, Teresa W. (1998). Fundamentals of domination in graphs. S. T. Hedetniemi, Peter J. Slater. New York: Marcel Dekker. ISBN 0-8247-0033-3. OCLC 37903553.
- Domination in graphs : advanced topics. Teresa W. Haynes, S. T. Hedetniemi, Peter J. Slater. New York: Marcel Dekker. 1997. ISBN 0-585-28524-1. OCLC 45732428.
