= Heidi Thornquist =

American applied mathematician

Heidi Krista Thornquist is an American applied mathematician at Sandia National Laboratories known for her work on the Trilinos system of software for scientific computing. Her research interests include numerical linear algebra and electronic circuit simulation.

Thornquist majored in mathematics at Humboldt State University, graduating summa cum laude in 1998. She became a doctoral student of Danny C. Sorensen in computational and applied mathematics at Rice University, where she completed her Ph.D. in 2006. Her dissertation was Fixed-Polynomial Approximate Spectral Transformations for Preconditioning the Eigenvalue Problem. She began working at Sandia in 2003, while she was still at Rice, and remained there after completing her doctorate.

Thornquist is the lead developer of three packages within the Trilinos system: Anasazi, for computing eigenvalues, Belos, for solving systems of linear equations, and Teuchos, a suite of utilities and wrappers.
