= Lidia Angeleri Hügel =

Italian mathematician

Lidia Angeleri Hügel (born 1960) is an Italian mathematician whose research in abstract algebra and representation theory focuses on tilting theory and its offshoot, silting theory. She is a professor of algebra at the University of Verona.

== Education and career ==
Angeleri Hügel was born in Milan, in 1960. She studied mathematics at LMU Munich, completing a Ph.D. there in 1991 under the supervision of Wolfgang Zimmermann.

She continued at LMU as a postdoctoral researcher from 1992 to 2002, earning a habilitation there in 2000. In 2002, she was Ramon y Cajal Fellow at the Autonomous University of Barcelona, and briefly held an associate professorship at the University of Insubria, before moving to the University of Verona as an associate professor. She became full professor at the University of Verona in 2016.

At the University of Verona, she served as Vice-Rector for International Relations from 2013 to 2019.

== Book ==
Angeleri Hügel is the co-editor of the Handbook of Tilting Theory (Cambridge University Press, London Mathematical Society Lecture Note Series 332, 2007, with Dieter Happel and Henning Krause).
