= Ganti Prasada Rao =

Indian engineer and academic

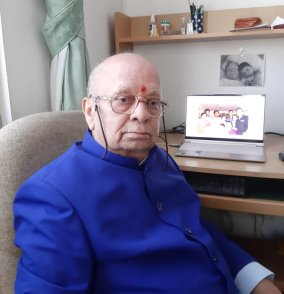
- Born: 25 August 1942 (age 84); Seethanagaram, Andhra Pradesh
- Education: Electrical Engineering and Control Systems
- Occupations: Electrical Engineering and Control Systems
- Years active: India: PSG College of Technology Coimbatore 1969-71; Indian Institute of Technology Kharagpur 1971-1997; 1997-Inventive Pathways-Management Consultancy, Abu Dhabi, UAE; 2006-Maharajah's College Vizianagaram; Engineering College, Kakinada (Now JNTUK Campus)
- Known for: Continuous-time system identification, Piecewise Constant Orthogonal Functions (PCBF) and General Hybrid Orthogonal Functions (GHOF) in systems and control

Ganti Prasada Rao (born 25 August 1942) is an Indian author, educator and researcher, well known in the field of systems and control in general, and as a pioneer in the applications of special orthogonal functions and Identification of Continuous-time Systems. For a comparative assessment of identification algorithms with continuous-time and discrete-time models, the Rao-Garnier test system became a bench mark.

In the early 1970s when the scientific community was 'going-completely-digital' in an indirect way via discrete-time models, he suggested the direct path of continuous time models for identification of dynamical systems and developed techniques which outperform the indirect methods. These direct methods are now used in the MATLAB compatible CONtinuous Time System IDentification (CONTSID) Toolbox. Developed at the Université de Lorraine in France. The importance of these identification methods is evident from their compatibility with real world physical systems.

After teaching and research in PSG College of Technology Coimbatore (1969–71)and Indian Institute of Technology Kharagpur (1971–97). He became a Member of the UNESCO-EOLSS Joint Committee in the UNESCO - EOLSS Project in 1996. In the course of this ongoing project under the auspices of the UNESCO, he has been actively associated with the development of (1) Encyclopedia of Desalination and Water Resources (DESWARE) and (2) Encyclopedia of Life support Systems (EOLSS).

== Education ==
Rao received the B.E. degree in Electrical Engineering from Andhra University, India in 1963 in first class and high honors, M.Tech. and Ph.D. degrees in 1965 and 1970 respectively, both from the Indian Institute of Technology (IIT), Kharagpur. Indian Institute of Technology Kharagpur which conferred on him its Distinguished Alumnus Award in 2019

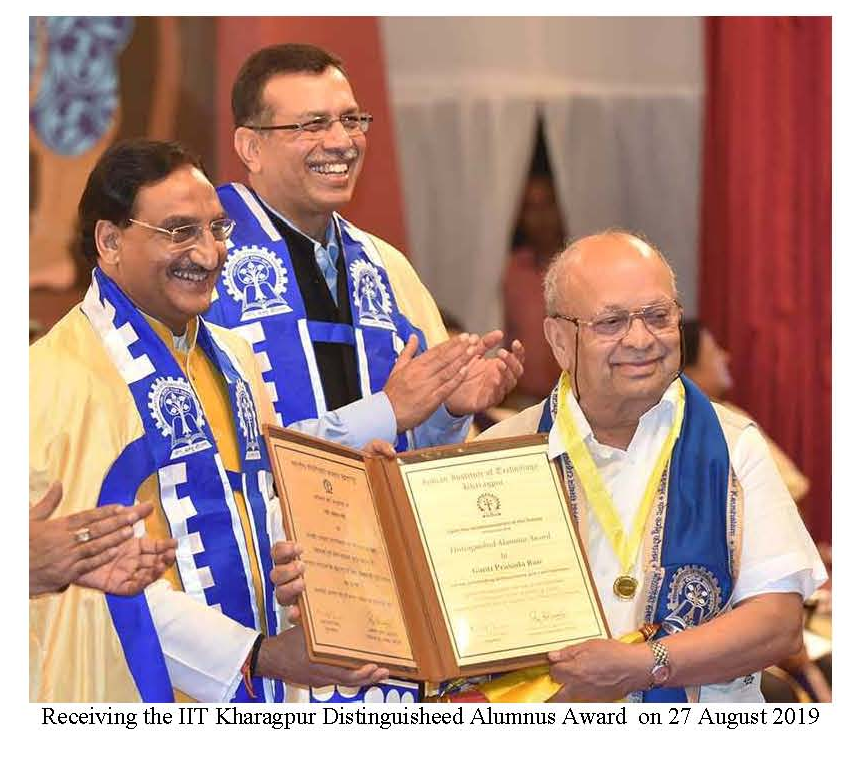
Ganti Prasada Rao Receiving the IIT Kharagpur Distinguished Alumnus Award 2019

== Research and Teaching Career ==
Apart from his work at PSG College of Technology, Coimbatore, India, IIT Kharagpur, he held the following positions:

1975 October - 1976 July, Commonwealth Postdoctoral Research Fellow, Control Systems Centre, University of Manchester Institute of Science and Technology (UMIST), Manchester, England,

1982-1983, 1985, 1991, 2003, 2004, and 2007: Research Fellow of the Alexander von Humboldt Foundation. Lehrstuhl für Elektrische Steuerung und Regelung, Ruhr-Universität Bochum, Germany; 2003, 2004 2007 Fraunhofer Institut für Rechnerarchitectkur und Softwaretchnik (Fraunhofer Institute - FIRST), Berlin

2003 Visiting professor Henri Poincaré University, Nancy, France.

2007 Royal Society sponsored Visiting Professor, Brunel University, UK.

== Lectures ==
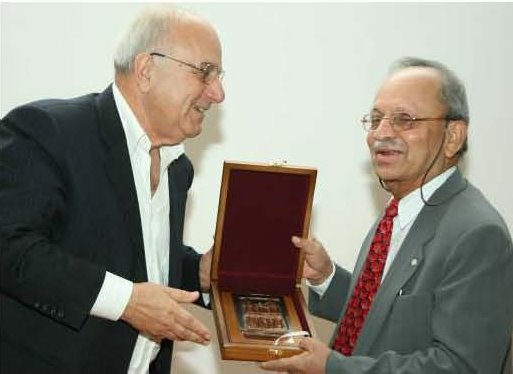
May 2009 Felicitation by Dr. A. Badran, Former UNESCO DDG and, Former Prime minister of Jordan

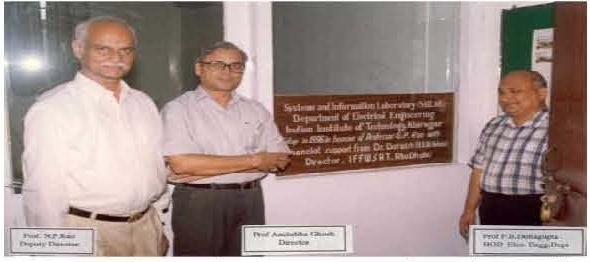
Inauguration of Systems and Information Laboratory established by IFFWSAT in the Department of Electrical Engineering IIT Kharagpur

Rao has been invited to give lectures around the world. They include the Faraday Memorial Lecture, on 22 September 2006 at Hyderabad under the auspices of the IEEE, the Karl Reinisch Memorial Lecture TU Ilmenau, 2007 and GRD Centenary Distinguished Lecture Coimbatore 2014 to mention a few . He has been an invited participant and plenary speaker at many international conferences of the International Federation of Automatic Control (IFAC), institutions and conferences such as the, Hungarian Academy of Sciences, Polish Academy of Sciences Wroclaw, USSR Academy of Sciences Moscow, etc. He was the Keynote Speaker ICSENG 2005, University of Nevada, Las Vegas, 17–19 August 2005. More recently at International Conference on Mathematics in Space and other Applied Sciences (ICMSAS-2019), 29–30 November 2019, Netaji Subhash Chandra Bose Memorial PG college, Hamirpur India and the Chief Guest at the International Conference on Advances in Applicable Mathematics, (ICAAM-2020) at Bharathiar University Coimbatore, India, 21–22 February 2020.

Some of his lectures are based on his investigations in search of hidden connections in mathematics and among some seemingly different fields of knowledge. One of the popular topics in this series is his own justification of the importance of the ancient Hindu concepts of zero and number systems and he shows how these concepts appear to have influenced the mind set of mathematicians to be viewed as the pillars of the world of mathematics.Video on YouTubeVideo on YouTube

== Books and Published Work ==
Over 150 published papers, Books and as CO-Editor

== Awards and honours ==
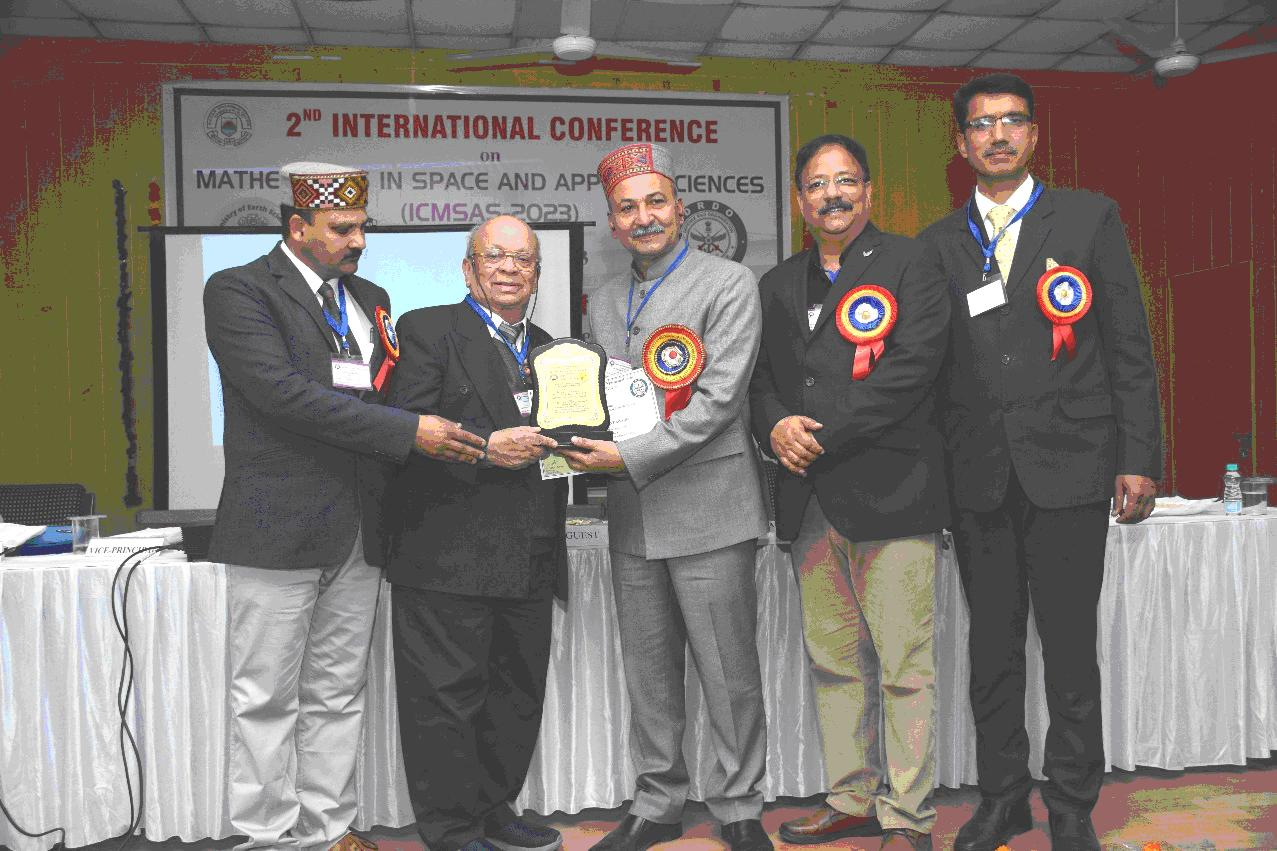
Lifetime achievement award presented at the Second International Conference on Mathematics in Space and Applied Sciences (ICMSAS-2023), Hamirpur, March 3–4, 2023

- IIT Kharagpur Distinguished Alumnus Award 2019.
- May 2009 Felicitation by Prof. Dr. A. Badran, former President University of Petra and Former UNESCO DDG and, Former Prime minister of Jordan
- The International Foundation for Water Science and Technology has established the 'Systems and Information Laboratory' in the Electrical Engineering Department at the Indian Institute of Technology, Kharagpur, in his honor.
- Lifetime achievement award presented at the Second International Conference on Mathematics in Space and Applied Sciences (ICMSAS-2023), Hamirpur, March 3–4, 2023 with the citation "First Generation Teacher of Computers and Computational Methods for his Valuable Contributions to Mathematics Applied to Systems and Signals"

== Personal life ==
Rao married Meenakshi (Vedula) in May 1963. They have three children Nagalakshmi, Rajeswari, Venkata Lakshminarayana and three grandchildren from the daughters. Meenakshi's book "Shaaka Paakam- Vegetarian Culinary Culture Of Telugu] (Andhra) Draavida Community Of South India" has been Published under the UNESCO-EOLSS Project as a contribution to the literature on conservation of culture.

He established two scholarships in memory of his parents for students of the EEE Department in VCE Hyderabad.

Rao's hobbies include vegetarian cooking and photography. He traveled with his wife Meenakshi around the world several times and lived in various places since 1975 and all their travels are documented. In one of his Safari travels in Tanzania he was accompanied by his friend Gollapudi Maruti Rao who wrote a travelogue describing this journey in Telugu "Teerthayaatra (Tanzania Travelogue)" )
