= Institute of Combinatorics and its Applications =

International scientific organization

- Abbreviation: ICA
- Type: 501(c)(3)
- Purpose: increase visibility and influence of the combinatorial community
- Location: Duluth, MN
- Board of directors: Daniel Panario, President Charles Colbourn, Vice-president; Dalibor Froncek, Vice-president; Anita Pasotti, Vice-president; Sarah Heuss, Secretary Bryan Freyberg, Registrar
- Website: http://www.the-ica.org/

The Institute of Combinatorics and its Applications (ICA) is an international scientific organization formed in 1990 to increase the visibility and influence of the combinatorial community. In pursuit of this goal, the ICA sponsors conferences, publishes a bulletin and awards a number of medals, including the Euler, Hall, Kirkman, and Stanton Medals. It is based in Duluth, Minnesota and its operation office is housed at University of Minnesota Duluth. The institute was minimally active between 2010 and 2016 and resumed its full activities in March 2016.

== Membership ==
The ICA has over 800 members in over forty countries. Membership is at three levels. Members are those who have not yet completed a Ph.D. Associate Fellows are younger members who have received the Ph.D. or have published extensively; normally an Associate Fellow should hold the rank of assistant professor. Fellows are expected to be established scholars and typically have the rank of associate professor or higher. Some members are involved in highly theoretical research; there are members whose primary interest lies in education and instruction; and there are members who are heavily involved in the applications of combinatorics in statistical design, communications theory, cryptography, computer security, and other practical areas.

Although being a fellow of the ICA is not itself a highly selective honor, the ICA also maintains another class of members, "honorary fellows", people who have made "pre-eminent contributions to combinatorics or its applications". The number of living honorary fellows is limited to ten at any time. The deceased honorary fellows include H. S. M. Coxeter, Paul Erdős, Haim Hanani, Bernhard Neumann, D. H. Lehmer, Leonard Carlitz, Robert Frucht, E. M. Wright, and Horst Sachs. Living honorary fellows include S. S. Shrikhande, C. R. Rao, G. J. Simmons, Vera Sós, Henry Gould, Carsten Thomassen, Neil Robertson, Cheryl Praeger, and R. M. Wilson.

== Publication ==
The ICA publishes the Bulletin of the ICA (ISSN 1183-1278), a journal that combines publication of survey and research papers with news of members and accounts of future and past conferences. It appears three times a year, in January, May and September and usually consists of 128 pages.

Beginning in 2017, the research articles in the Bulletin have been made available on an open access basis.

== Medals ==
The ICA awards the Euler Medals annually for distinguished career contributions to combinatorics by a member of the institute who is still active in research. It is named after the 18th century mathematician Leonhard Euler.

The ICA awards the Hall Medals, named after Marshall Hall, Jr., to recognize outstanding achievements by members who are not over age 40.

The ICA awards the Kirkman Medals, named after Thomas Kirkman, to recognize outstanding achievements by members who are within four years past their Ph.D.

The winners of the medals for the years between 2010 and 2015 were decided by the ICA Medals Committee between November 2016 and February 2017 after the ICA resumed its activities in 2016.

In 2016, the ICA voted to institute an ICA medal to be known as the Stanton Medal, named after Ralph Stanton, in recognition of substantial and sustained contributions, other than research, to promoting the discipline of combinatorics. The Stanton Medal honours significant lifetime contributions to promoting the discipline of combinatorics through advocacy, outreach, service, teaching and/or mentoring. At most one medal per year is to be awarded, typically to a Fellow of the ICA.

=== List of Euler Medal winners ===
Year	Winners
2025	Leo Storme
2024	Gyula O. H. Katona
2023	Jennifer Seberry
2022	George Andrews
2021	Hendrik Van Maldeghem
2020	Marston Conder
2019	no medal awarded
2018	Dieter Jungnickel
2017	Fan Chung
2016	James Hirschfeld
2015	No medal awarded
2014	Brian Alspach
2013	Curt Lindner
2012	Alex Rosa
2011	Cheryl Praeger
2010	Bojan Mohar
2009	– no medal awarded –
2008	Gábor Korchmáros
2007	Stephen Milne, Heiko Harborth
2006	Clement W. H. Lam, Nick Wormald
2005	Ralph Faudree, Aviezri Fraenkel
2004	Doron Zeilberger, Zhu Lie
2003	Peter Cameron, Charles Colbourn
2002	Herbert Wilf
2001	Spyros Magliveras
2000	Richard A. Brualdi, Horst Sachs
1999	D. K. Ray-Chaudhuri
1998	Peter Ladislaw Hammer, Anthony Hilton
1997	– no medal awarded –
1996	J.H. van Lint
1995	Hanfried Lenz
1994	Joseph A. Thas
1993	Claude Berge, Ronald Graham

=== List of Hall Medal winners ===
Year	Winners
2025	Hong Liu and Binzhou Xia
2024	Geertrui Van de Voorde and Rjko Nenadov
2023	Jan Goedgebeur and Kenta Ozeki
2022	Jan De Beule and Pablo Spiga
2021	Tao Feng and Anita Pasotti
2020	Jie Ma
2019	Koen Thas and Jeroen Schillewaert
2018	Kai-Uwe Schmidt
2017	John Bamberg and Daniel Horsley
2016	– no medal awarded –
2015	Lijun Ji
2014	Peter Dukes
2013	Bart De Bruyn
2012	Michael Giudici
2011	Olga Polverino
2010	Catherine Greenhill
2009	– no medal awarded –
2008	Ian Wanless
2007	David Pike
2006	Darryn Bryant, Gennian Ge, Heather Jordon
2005	Jonathan Jedwab
2004	Dirk Hachenberger, Masaaki Harada
2003	Antonio Cossidente
2002	Saad El-Zanati
2001	Alfred Menezes, Alexander Pott
2000	Michael Henning, Klaus Metsch
1999	Hendrik Van Maldeghem, Rolf Rees
1998	Marco Buratti, Arrigo Bonisoli
1997	Reinhard Diestel
1996	Christos Koukouvinos, Christine O'Keefe, Tim Penttila
1995	Donald Kreher
1994	Ortrud Oellermann, Chris Rodger, Doug Stinson

=== List of Kirkman Medal winners ===
Year	Winners
2025	Chi Hoi Yip, Peter Bradshaw
2024	Jozefien D'Haeseleer, Zixiang Xu
2023	Yifan Jing, Sam Mattheus
2022	Melissa Huggan, Ziqing Xiang
2021	Yujie Gu, Natasha Morrison
2020	Chong Shangguan
2019	Tao Zhang
2018	Alexander Bors, Shuxing Li
2017	Hengjia Wei, Binzhou Xia
2016	Yue Zhou
2015	Padraig Ó Catháin
2014	Daniele Bartoli
2013	Tommaso Traetta
2012	Rebecca Stones, Xiande Zhang
2011	Tao Feng
2010	Daniel Horsley, Kai-Uwe Schmidt
2009	– no medal awarded –
2008	Nick Cavenagh, Futaba Okamoto
2007	Petteri Kaski, Peter Dukes
2006	John Bamberg, Giuseppe Marino, Koen Thas
2005	Michael Giudici, Matt Walsh
2004	Andreas Enge, Jon-Lark Kim
2003	Ken-ichi Kawarabayashi, Mateja Sajna, Sanming Zhou
2002	Ian Wanless
2001	Matthew Brown, Alan Ling, Ying Miao
2000	Michael Raines
1999	Nicholas Hamilton, Qing Xiang
1998	Peter Adams, Cai Heng Li
1997	Makoto Matsumoto, Bernhard Schmidt
1996	Gregory Gutin, Patric R. J. Östergård
1995	Darryn Bryant
1994	Robert Craigen, Jonathan Jedwab

=== List of Stanton Medal winners ===
Year	Winners
2025	Gary Mullen
2024	no medal awarded -
2023	no medal awarded -
2022	Doug Stinson
2021	Gary Chartrand
2020	no medal awarded -
2019	Charlie Colbourn
2018	– no medal awarded –
2017	Robin Wilson
2016	Ronald Mullin
