= Redło =

Redło may refer to either of two villages in Poland that were in Germany before 1945:

- Redło, Świdwin County
- Redło, Goleniów County
