= SwingWiki =

SwingWiki may refer to one of the following:

- swingwiki.org, a now-defunct Java Swing developer wiki (the domain has been cybersquatted)
- swingwiki.com, a now-defunct swing dance information wiki (the domain has been parked)
- swing-ev.de, a student organisation for industrial and computer engineering at the Ilmenau University of Technology
