= Oliver Sawodny =

German electrical engineer

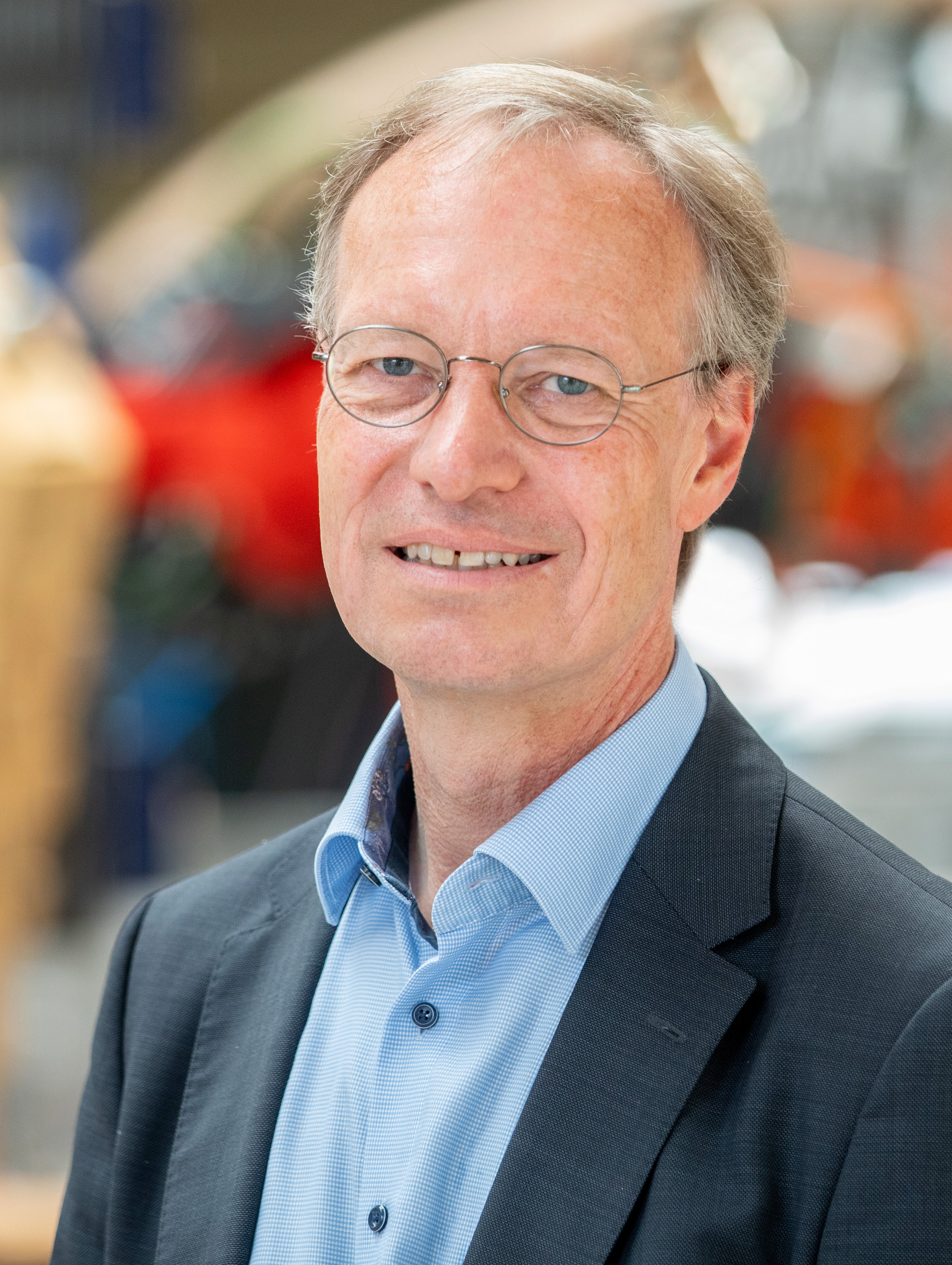
Sawodny in 2022

Oliver Sawodny (born 1966 in Stuttgart) is a German electrical engineer and university professor. He is the director of the Institute for System Dynamics at the University of Stuttgart since 2005.

== Life ==
Professor Sawodny received his Dipl.-Ing. degree in electrical engineering from the University of Karlsruhe, Karlsruhe, Germany, in 1991 and his Ph.D. degree from the University of Ulm, Ulm, Germany, in 1996. In 2002, he became a Full Professor at the Technical University of Ilmenau, Ilmenau, Germany. Since 2005, he has been the Director of the Institute for System Dynamics, University of Stuttgart, Stuttgart, Germany.

His current research interests include methods of differential geometry, trajectory generation, and applications to mechatronic systems. He received important paper awards in major control application journals such as IEEE Transaction on Control System Technology Outstanding Paper Award (2013). Oliver Sawodny is member of the editorial board of several journals. At the Institute for System Dynamics at the University of Stuttgart, he is currently leading a growing group of about fifty people. He has research collaboration projects with many companies as Audi, Bosch, Daimler, Zeiss, among others. Additionally, he is the spokesman of large research initiatives of the German science foundation (DFG) like the CRC 1244 Adaptive skins and structures for the built environment of tomorrow and the RTG 2543 Intraoperative Multisensory Tissue Differentiation in Oncology. He is member in the board of directors of the Cluster of Excellence Integrative Computational Design and Construction for Architecture (IntCDC).

== Selected publications ==
- Tobias Mahl, Alexander Hildebrandt, Oliver Sawodny (Hrsg.): A variable curvature continuum kinematics for kinematic control of the bionic handling assistant. In: IEEE Transactions on Robotics, Volume: 30, Issue: 4, August 2014, p. 935-949, ISSN 1552-3098.
- Julia Sachs, Oliver Sawodny (Hrsg.): A Two-Stage Model Predictive Control Strategy for Economic Diesel-PV-Battery Island Microgrid Operation in Rural Areas. In: IEEE Transactions on Sustainable Energy, Volume: 7, Issue: 3, July 2016, p. 903 - 913, ISSN 1949-3029.
- Sebastian Küchler, Tobias Mahl, Jörg Neupert, Klaus Schneider, Oliver Sawodny (Hrsg.): Active control for an offshore crane using prediction of the vessels motion. In: IEEE/ASME Transactions on Mechatronics, Volume: 16, Issue: 2, April 2011, p. 297-309, ISSN 1083-4435.
- Valentin Falkenhahn, Tobias Mahl; Alexander Hildebrandt, Rüdiger Neumann, Oliver Sawodny (Hrsg.): Dynamic Modeling of Bellows-Actuated Continuum Robots Using the Euler–Lagrange Formalism. In: IEEE Transactions on Robotics, Volume: 31, Issue: 6, December 2015, p. 1483 - 1496, ISSN 1552-3098.
- Frank A. Bender, Martin Kaszynski, Oliver Sawodny (Hrsg.): Drive Cycle Prediction and Energy Management Optimization for Hybrid Hydraulic Vehicles. In: IEEE Transactions on Vehicular Technology, Volume: 62, Issue: 8, October 2013, p. 3581 - 3592, ISSN 0018-9545.
- Valentin Falkenhahn, Alexander Hildebrandt, Rüdiger Neumann, Oliver Sawodny (Hrsg.): Dynamic Control of the Bionic Handling Assistant. In: IEEE/ASME Transactions on Mechatronics, Volume: 22, Issue: 1, February 2017, p. 6 - 17 ISSN 1083-4435.
- Christoph Gohrle, Andreas Schindler, Andreas Wagner, Oliver Sawodny (Hrsg.): Design and Vehicle Implementation of Preview Active Suspension Controllers. In: IEEE Transactions on Control Systems Technology, Volume: 22, Issue: 3, May 2014, p. 1135 - 1142, ISSN 1063-6536.
- Frank A. Bender, Simon Göltz, Thomas Bräunl, Oliver Sawodny (Hrsg.): Modeling and Offset-Free Model Predictive Control of a Hydraulic Mini Excavator. In: IEEE Transactions on Automation Science and Engineering, Volume: 14, Issue: 4, October 2017, p. 1682 - 1694, ISSN 1545-5955.
- Stefan Schaut, Oliver Sawodny (Hrsg.): Thermal Management for the Cabin of a Battery Electric Vehicle Considering Passengers' Comfort. In: IEEE Transactions on Control Systems Technology, Volume: 28, Issue: 4, July 2020, p. 1476-1492, ISSN 1063-6536.
- Janine Guenther, Oliver Sawodny (Hrsg.): Feature selection and Gaussian Process regression for personalized thermal comfort prediction. In: Building and Environment, Volume 148, 2019, p. 448-458, ISSN 0360-1323.
- Florentin Rauscher, Oliver Sawodny (Hrsg.): Modeling and Control of Tower Cranes with Elastic Structure. In: IEEE Transactions on Control Systems Technology, Volume: 29, Issue: 1, January 2021, p. 64 - 79, ISSN 1063-6536.
- Florian Morlock, Bernhard Rolle, Michel Bauer, Florian Morlock, Oliver Sawodny (Hrsg.): Forecasts of Electric Vehicle Energy Consumption Based on Characteristic Speed Profiles and Real-Time Traffic Data. In: IEEE Transactions on Vehicular Technology, Volume: 69, Issue: 2, February 2020, p. 1404-1418, ISSN 0018-9545.
