= Heinz Haferkorn =

German physicist (b. 1927, d. 2003)

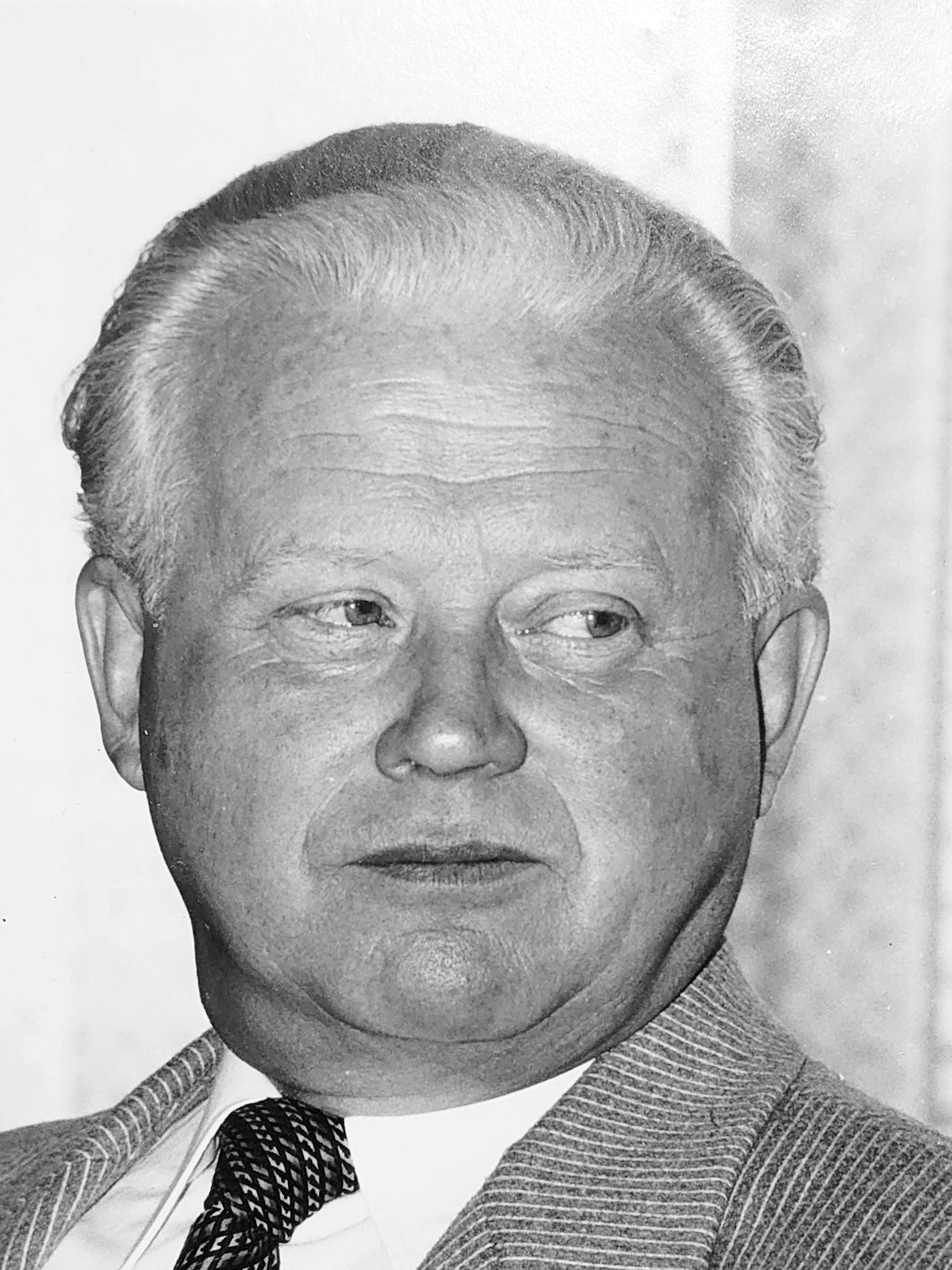
- Heinz Haferkorn 1987
- Born: February 22, 1927; Leipzig, Saxony, Germany
- Died: May 31, 2003; Ilmenau, Thuringia, Germany
- Education: Technische Universität Ilmenau
- Scientific career
- Fields: Optical engineering
- Workplaces: Technische Universität Ilmenau

Heinz Haferkorn (born 22 February 1927 in Leipzig; † 31 May 2003 in Ilmenau) was a German physicist for optical engineering. He was holding the Chair Optical engineering at the Technische Universität Ilmenau. Topics of his chair included: "Fifth-order image error theory, analytical approaches to optical systems, theory and measurements of the transfer function, mathematical methods of automatic correction, partially coherent imaging and modeling of the photolithographic process".

Among other things, Heinz Haferkorn headed the Optics Association of the Physical Society of the GDR (1973-1990), was a member of editorial boards of various specialist journals and the National Optics Commission. Here he was committed to uniform terminology and clear definitions in optics and also worked on the standardization of formula symbols and sign rules.
