= Jungnickel =

Jungnickel is a German surname. Notable people with this name include:

- Christa Jungnickel (1935–1990), German-American historian of science
- Dieter Jungnickel (born 1952), German mathematician
- Dirk Jungnickel (born 1944), German actor
- Edgar Jungnickel (1914–1992), German U-boat officer
- Ingmar Jungnickel, German aerodynamics coach, winner of 2018 USOC Coach of the Year
- Isabelle Jungnickel, Austrian politician, deputy director of Innere Stadt
- Lars Jungnickel (born 1981), German footballer
- Ludwig Heinrich Jungnickel (1881–1965), Austrian artist
- Max Jungnickel (writer) (1890–1945), German novelist and Nazi
- Max Jungnickel (politician) (1868–1934), Social Democratic member of Weimar National Assembly
- Ross Jungnickel (1875–1962), American music publisher and arranger
- Sascha Jungnickel, programmer of The Oath (video game)
