= Gábor Korchmáros =

Hungarian mathematician

Gábor Korchmáros (born 1948) is a Hungarian mathematician, who works on finite geometry.

== Biography ==
Korchmáros received in 1972 from the University of Budapest a Ph.D. in mathematics. In 1973 on a postdoc grant, he studied at the Research Center of the Accademia dei Lincei in Rome. In 1976 he was awarded the Grunwald Prize of the János Bolyai Mathematical Society. In 1980 he received the Candidate of Sciences degree and in 2000 the Doctor of Sciences degree from the János Bolyai Mathematical Society. In 1987 he became a professor at the Università della Basilicata. He was a visiting professor at several universities, including the University of Sussex, the University of Delaware and the University of Szeged (Hungary).

His research involves the theory of ovals and their higher-dimensional generalizations over finite fields. One topic of his research is the collineation groups of ovals and embedding problems for arcs in ovals; these investigations have applications in coding theory and are related to the Hasse-Weil bound for elliptic curves. He also works on algebraic curves over finite fields and their automorphism groups, translation planes, finite Möbius planes, finite Minkowski planes, and elliptic curve cryptography. In the late 1970s he worked with Beniamino Segre.

He was awarded the Euler Medal of ICA in 2008, and in 2014 the Doctor Honoris Casusa degree at the University of Szeged.

== Selected works ==
- 1979: Questioni relative ad ovali astratte
- 1998: (as editor with E. Ballico) Recent Progress in Geometry, Circolo Matematico di Palermo
- 2008: (with J. W. P. Hirschfeld & F. Torres), Algebraic Curves over a Finite Field, Princeton University Press, Google books link
- 2010: (with M. Giulietti) Giulietti, M.; Korchmáros, G. (2010). "Algebraic curves with a large non-tame automorphism group fixing no point". Transactions of the American Mathematical Society. 362 (11): 5983–6001. doi:10.1090/s0002-9947-2010-05025-1. MR 2661505.
- 2019: (with M. Giulietti) Giulietti, Massimo; Korchmáros, Gábor (2019). "Algebraic curves with many automorphisms". Advances in Mathematics. 349: 162–211. arXiv:1702.08812. doi:10.1016/j.aim.2019.04.003. MR 2661505. S2CID 119269948.
