= Sachs subgraph =

In graph theory, a Sachs subgraph of a given graph is a subgraph in which all connected components are either single edges or cycles. These subgraphs are named after Horst Sachs, who used them in an expansion of the characteristic polynomial of the adjacency matrix of graphs. A similar expansion using Sachs subgraphs is also possible for permanental polynomials of graphs. Sachs subgraphs and the polynomials calculated with their aid have been applied in chemical graph theory, for instance as part of a test for the existence of non-bonding orbitals in hydrocarbon structures.

A spanning Sachs subgraph, also called a {1,2}-factor, is a Sachs subgraph in which every vertex of the given graph is incident to an edge of the subgraph. The union of two perfect matchings is always a bipartite spanning Sachs subgraph, but in general Sachs subgraphs are not restricted to being bipartite. Some authors use the term "Sachs subgraph" to mean only spanning Sachs subgraphs.
