= Spyros Magliveras =

Greek American mathematician

Spyros Simos Magliveras (born 6 September 1938 in Athens) is a Greek-born American mathematician and computer scientist.

== Biography ==
Magliveras graduated from the University of Florida with a bachelor's degree in electrical engineering in 1961 and a master's degree in mathematics in 1963. He was from 1963 to 1964 an instructor of mathematics at Florida Presbyterian College and from 1964 to 1968 a teaching fellow in mathematics at the University of Michigan, as well as from 1965 to 1968 a programming analyst and a systems analyst at the University of Michigan Institute for Social Research. He received his PhD in mathematics from the University of Birmingham, UK in 1970 with thesis advisor Donald Livingstone and thesis The subgroup structure of the Higman-Sims simple group.

At the State University of New York at Oswego, he was from 1970 to 1973 an assistant professor and from 1973 to 1978 an associate professor. From 1978 to 2000 he was a professor of mathematics and computer science at the University of Nebraska–Lincoln, retiring as professor emeritus in 2000. Since 2000 he has been a professor at Florida Atlantic University (FAU). He was the director of FAU's Center for Cryptology and Information Security from 2003 to 2013, and since 2013 he has been the center's associate director.

He has been a visiting professor at the University of Birmingham (1984/85), at the University of Waterloo (1999), at the Sapienza University of Rome (two months in 2000), and at the University of Western Australia (two months in 2000).

Magliveras does research on combinatorial designs, permutation groups, finite geometries, encryption of data (cryptography), and data security. In 2001 he received the Euler Medal. He is a co-author of the 2007 book Secure group communications over data networks.

Magliveras is married since 1961 and has two children.
