= Ratner's theorems =

In mathematics, Ratner's theorems are a group of major theorems in ergodic theory concerning unipotent flows on homogeneous spaces proved by Marina Ratner around 1990. The theorems grew out of Ratner's earlier work on horocycle flows. The study of the dynamics of unipotent flows played a decisive role in the proof of the Oppenheim conjecture by Grigory Margulis. Ratner's theorems have guided key advances in the understanding of the dynamics of unipotent flows. Their later generalizations provide ways to both sharpen the results and extend the theory to the setting of arbitrary semisimple algebraic groups over a local field.

== Short description ==
The Ratner orbit closure theorem asserts that the closures of orbits of unipotent flows on the quotient of a Lie group by a lattice are nice, geometric subsets. The Ratner equidistribution theorem further asserts that each such orbit is equidistributed in its closure. The Ratner measure classification theorem is the weaker statement that every ergodic invariant probability measure is homogeneous, or algebraic: this turns out to be an important step towards proving the more general equidistribution property. There is no universal agreement on the names of these theorems: they are variously known as the "measure rigidity theorem", the "theorem on invariant measures" and its "topological version", and so on.

The formal statement of such a result is as follows. Let $G$ be a Lie group, $\mathit{\Gamma}$ a lattice in $G$, and $u^t$ a one-parameter subgroup of $G$ consisting of unipotent elements, with the associated flow $\phi_t$ on $\mathit{\Gamma} \setminus G$. Then the closure of every orbit $\left\{ xu^t \right\}$ of $\phi_t$ is homogeneous. This means that there exists a connected, closed subgroup $S$ of $G$ such that the image of the orbit $\, xS \,$ for the action of $S$ by right translations on $G$ under the canonical projection to $\mathit{\Gamma} \setminus G$ is closed, has a finite $S$-invariant measure, and contains the closure of the $\phi_t$-orbit of $x$ as a dense subset.

=== Example: $SL_2(\mathbb R)$ ===
The simplest case to which the statement above applies is $G = SL_2(\mathbb R)$. In this case it takes the following more explicit form; let $\Gamma$ be a lattice in $SL_2(\mathbb R)$ and $F \subset \Gamma \backslash G$ a closed subset which is invariant under all maps $\Gamma g \mapsto \Gamma (gu_t)$ where
$$u_t = \begin{pmatrix} 1 & t \\ 0 & 1 \end{pmatrix}$$
. Then either there exists an $x \in \Gamma \backslash G$ such that $F = xU$ (where $U = \{u_t, t \in \mathbb R\}$) or $F = \Gamma \backslash G$.

In geometric terms $\Gamma$ is a cofinite Fuchsian group, so the quotient $M = \Gamma \backslash \mathbb H^2$ of the hyperbolic plane by $\Gamma$ is a hyperbolic orbifold of finite volume. The theorem above implies that every horocycle of $\mathbb H^2$ has an image in $M$ which is either a closed curve (a horocycle around a cusp of $M$) or dense in $M$.

== See also ==
- Danzer set
- Equidistribution theorem
