= Charles Colbourn =

Canadian computer scientist and mathematician

- Born: Charles Joseph Colbourn; October 24, 1953
- Education: University of Toronto; University of Waterloo
- Awards: Euler Medal
- Scientific career
- Fields: Mathematics; Computer Science
- Institutions: University of Vermont; Arizona State University
- Thesis: The Complexity of Graph Isomorphism and Related Problems (1980)
- Website: search.asu.edu/profile/384970

Charles Joseph Colbourn (born October 24, 1953) is a Canadian computer scientist and mathematician, whose research concerns graph algorithms, combinatorial designs, and their applications. From 1996 to 2001 he was the Dorothean Professor of Computer Science at the University of Vermont; since then he has been a professor of Computer Science and Engineering at Arizona State University.

== Early life ==
Colbourn was born on October 24, 1953, in Toronto, Ontario; despite working in the United States since 1996 he retains his Canadian citizenship. He did his undergraduate studies at the University of Toronto, graduating in 1976; after a master's degree at the University of Waterloo, he returned to Toronto for a Ph.D., which he received in 1980 under the supervision of Derek Corneil. He has held faculty positions at the University of Saskatchewan, University of Waterloo, University of Vermont, and Arizona State University, as well as visiting positions at several other universities. He has been one of three editors-in-chief of the Journal of Combinatorial Designs since 1992.

In 2004, the Institute of Combinatorics and its Applications named Colbourn as that year's winner of their Euler Medal for lifetime achievements in combinatorics.
