= Zdzisław Bubnicki =

Polish scientist

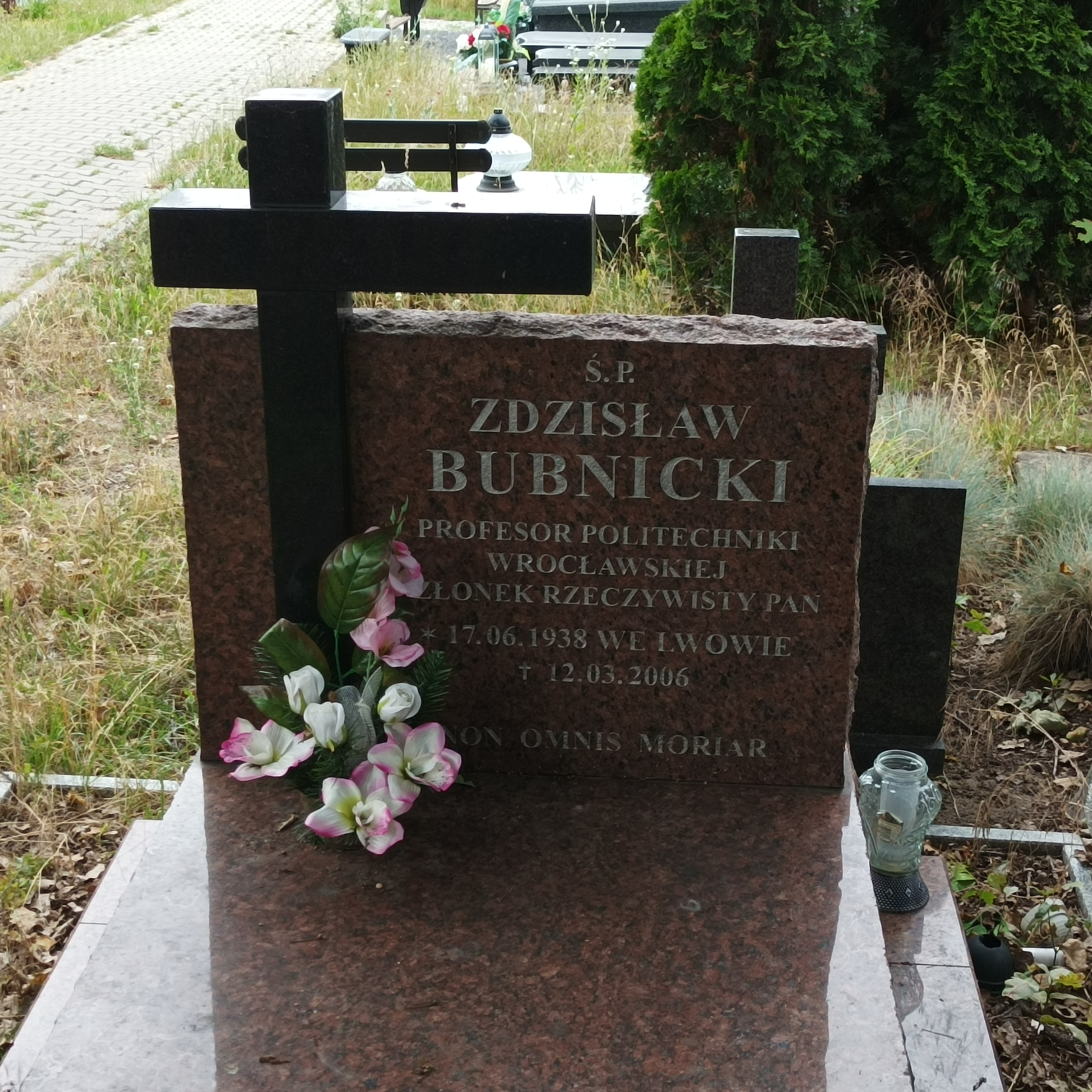
- Born: June 17, 1938; Lwów, Poland
- Died: March 12, 2006 (aged 67); Wrocław, Poland
- Education: Silesian University of Technology, Gliwice
- Known for: Uncertain variables, Bubnicki's logic-algebraic method, contribution to decision theory, control theory, system identification, operations research
- Awards: Order of Polonia Restituta
- Scientific career
- Fields: Computer science
- Workplaces: Polish Academy of Sciences; Wrocław University of Technology
- Doctoral advisor: Stefan Węgrzyn
- Doctoral students: Jan Węglarz

Zdzisław Bubnicki (born 17 June 1938 in Lwów, died 12 March 2006 in Wrocław) was a Polish scientist, a specialist in the fields of automation and computer science. His main scientific interests concerned: decision theory, control theory, system identification, pattern recognition, expert systems, and knowledge-based systems, complexes of operations, and methodology of computer systems.

He obtained a degree of Master of Science in 1960 at Faculty of Electronics at Silesian University of Technology in Gliwice. Since 1962 he moved to Wroclaw where he worked at Wroclaw University of Technology. In 1964 he achieved a Ph.D. degree, and in 1967 - a Doctor of Sciences degree. Several years later, in 1973 he became an assistant professor and in 1979 - a professor.

For many years he was a chief of Institute of Control and Systems Techniques at Wroclaw University of Technology. He was a founder of the International Conference on Systems Engineering.

Since 1986 he became a correspondent member of Polish Academy of Sciences (PAS), and since 1994 - a real member of PAS.

Prof. Bubnicki was a supervisor of 44 Ph.D. dissertations, and now 16 of them are professors. Results of his work had a big influence on the control and decision theory. Especially so called uncertain variables, that are extensions of fuzzy sets, was one of his biggest contributions to the field of computer science.

He was honoured with many Polish and international rewards, e.g. Krzyż Kawalerski i Krzyż Oficerski Orderu Odrodzenia Polski, IFIP medal. He is a doctor of honoris causa of following universities: West Pomeranian University of Technology, Poznan University of Technology, Military University of Technology.

== Books written by Zdzisław Bubnicki ==
1. "Identyfikacja obiektów sterowania", PWN, Warszawa, 1974
2. "Identification of Control Plants", Elsevier, Amsterdam-Oxford-New York, 1980
3. "Wstęp do systemów ekspertowych", PWN, Warszawa, 1990
4. "Podstawy informatycznych systemów zarządzania", Wydawnictwo Politechniki Wrocławskiej, Wrocław, 1993
5. "Uncertain Logics, Variables and Systems", Springer-Verlag, Berlin, 2002
6. "Analysis and Decision Making in Uncertain Systems", Springer-Verlag, London, 2004
7. "Teoria i algorytmy sterowania", PWN, Warszawa 2002, 2005
8. "Modern Control Theory", Springer-Verlag, Berlin, 2005
