= Ludwig Danzer =

German mathematician (1927–2011)

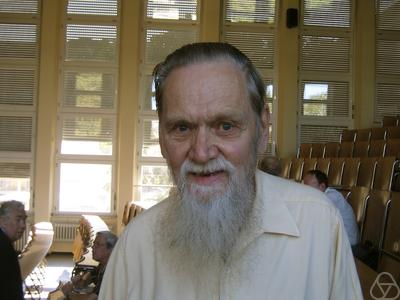
- Ludwig Danzer in 2006
- Born: 15 November 1927; Munich, Germany
- Died: 3 December 2011 (aged 84)
- Education: Technical University of Munich
- Known for: Danzer set Danzer cube
- Scientific career
- Fields: Mathematics
- Workplaces: Technical University of Dortmund
- Thesis: Über zwei Lagerungsprobleme (1960)
- Doctoral advisor: Hanfried Lenz; Robert Sauer; Frank Löbell
- Doctoral students: Egon Schulte

Ludwig Danzer (15 November 1927 – 3 December 2011) was a German geometer working in discrete geometry. He was a student of Hanfried Lenz, starting his career in 1960 with a thesis about "Lagerungsprobleme".

Danzer's name is popularized in the concepts of a Danzer set, a set of points that touches all large convex sets, and the Danzer cube, an example of a non-shellable triangulation of the cube. It is an example of a power complex, studied by Danzer in the 1980s.

Danzer also found many new tilings.

Ludwig Danzer worked at the Technical University of Dortmund and died on December 3, 2011, after a long illness.

Danzer had at least ten students, the most prominent one being Egon Schulte.
