= Jan Węglarz =

Polish computer scientist

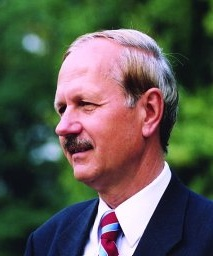
- prof. Jan Węglarz
- Born: September 24, 1947 (age 78); Poznań, Poland
- Education: Poznań University of Technology
- Known for: contribution to operations research
- Scientific career
- Fields: Computer science
- Workplaces: Poznań University of Technology
- Doctoral advisor: Zdzisław Bubnicki

Jan Węglarz (born 24 September 1947 in Poznań) is a Polish computer scientist. His current research focuses on operations research. He is the winner of the 2000 Prize of the Foundation for Polish Science.

== Life and career ==
He studied at the University of Adam Mickiewicz in Poznań, where he graduated in mathematics in 1969, and later on Poznań University of Technology, when he received title from automatics in 1971. He started work there in 1971. He received a doctorate in 1974, and habilitation in 1977. In 1988 he received the title of professor. Member of Polish Academy of Sciences (Polska Akademia Nauk, PAN), member-co-founder of Polish Information Processing Society ("Polskie Towarzystwo Informatyczne", PTI), member of American Mathematical Society, Operations Research Society of America, member of Poznan Chapter of Agder Academy of Sciences and Letters. Author of 12 monographs in Computer Science, Operation Research, Decision Theory, etc. Author of more than 200 articles. He discovered the so-called two-phase method, but since he published his discovery in a Polish journal, the discovery was largely overlooked abroad. He refused many offers to move to the West and opted for his own research team in Poland.

He participated in the development of Elwro Polish computers.

In 1991, he was awarded the EURO Gold Medal, the highest distinction within Operations Research in Europe. In 2000, he received Poland's top science award, the Prize of the Foundation for Polish Science, for "developing a variety of methods for designing IT systems for production management and control, using discrete-continuous scheduling". In 2018 he received the EURO Distinguished Service Award. He was awarded the decorations of Knight's Cross (1991), Officer (1997) and Commander (2004) in the Order of Polonia Restituta.

Between 1997 and 1998 he was President of Association of European Operational Research Societies.

He received honorary degrees from several Polish institutions: Szczecin University of Technology (Politechnika Szczecińska) (December 10, 2001), AGH University of Science and Technology (October 16, 2002), Częstochowa University of Technology (Politechnika Częstochowska) (April 22, 2005), Poznań University of Technology (January 14, 2006), Gdańsk University of Technology (Politechnika Gdańska) (April 16, 2008), University of Silesia (Uniwersytet Śląski) (July 2, 2008), University of Zielona Góra (June 5, 2009).
