= Lomnička (Stará Ľubovňa District) =

- Municipality
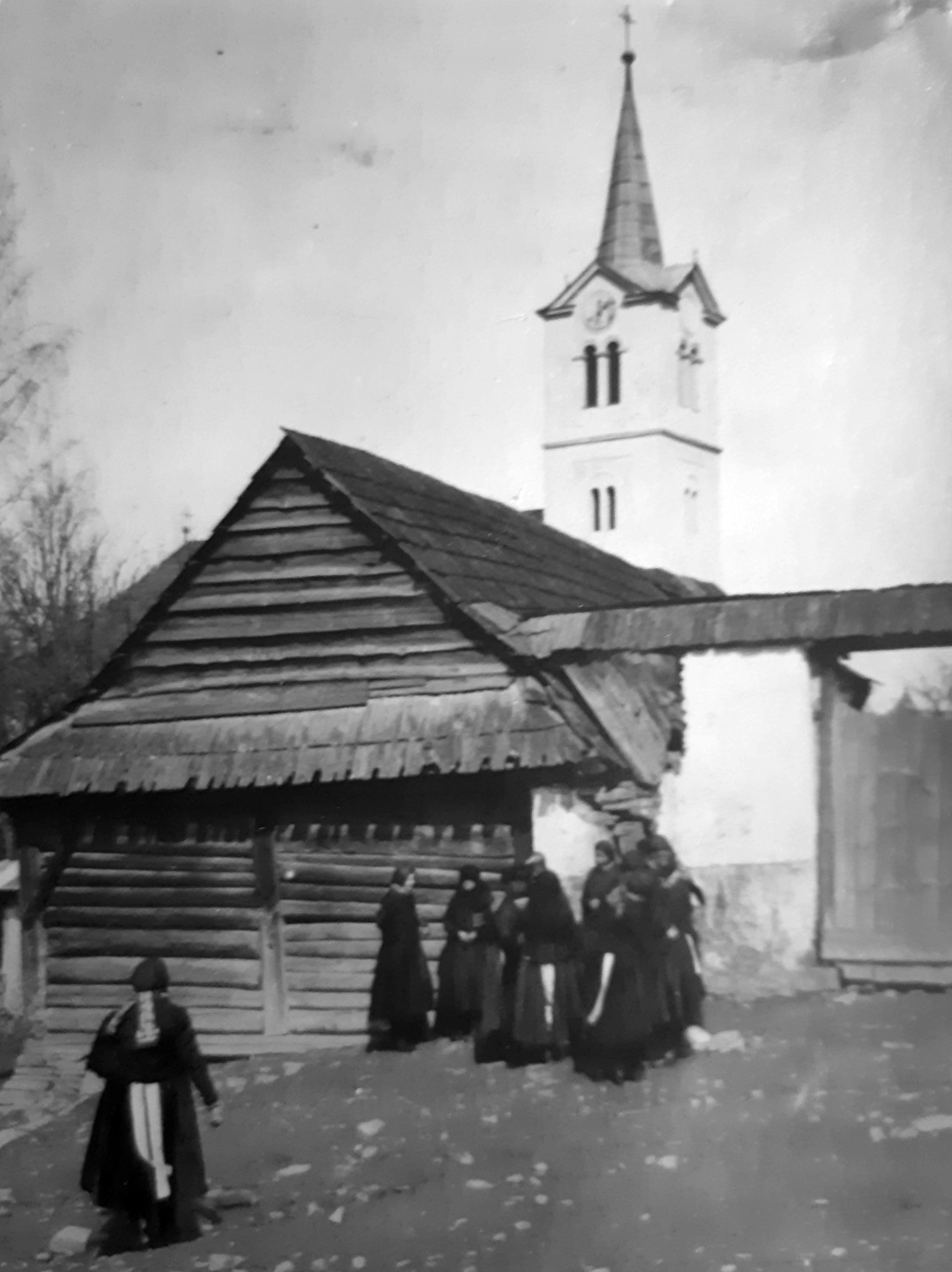

- Flag

- Location of Lomnička in the Prešov Region Location of Lomnička in Slovakia
- Coordinates: 49°15′N 20°34′E
- Country: Slovakia
- Region: Prešov Region
- District: Stará Ľubovňa District
- First mentioned: 1294

Area
  - Total: 9.56 km^{2} (3.69 sq mi)
- Elevation: 615 m (2,018 ft)

Population (2025)
  - Total: 3,839
- Time zone: UTC+1 (CET)
  - Summer (DST): UTC+2 (CEST)
- Postal code: 650 3
- Area code: +421 52
- Vehicle registration plate (until 2022): SL
- Website: www.obeclomnicka.sk

Lomnička (German: Kleinlomnitz; Hungarian: Kislomnic; Rusyn: Ломнічка) is a village and municipality in Stará Ľubovňa District in the Prešov Region of northern Slovakia. Till 1945 the name was KleinLomnitz for 'Small'Lomnitz.

== History ==
In historical records the village was first mentioned in 1294. The population was mostly German speaking till August 1944. Before the establishment of independent Czechoslovakia in 1918, Lomnička was part of Szepes County within the Kingdom of Hungary. From 1939 to 1945, it was part of the Slovak Republic. On 25 January 1945, the Red Army dislodged the Wehrmacht from Lomnička and it was once again part of Czechoslovakia.

== Geography ==
The municipality lies at an altitude of 615 metres (2,018 ft) and covers an area of 9.56 km^{2} (3.69 sq mi) (2025).

== Population ==
Population statistic (10 years)
Year	1995	2005	2015	2025
Count	1165	1865	3093	3839
Difference		+60.08%	+65.84%	+24.11%

Population statistic
Year	2024	2025
Count	3728	3839
Difference		+2.97%

It has a population of 3839 people (31 December 2025).

=== Ethnicity ===
Census 2021 (1+ %)
Ethnicity	Number	Fraction
Slovak	3100	95.7%
Romani	2193	67.7%
Not found out	122	3.76%
Total	3239	

In year 2021 was 3239 people by ethnicity 3100 as Slovak, 2193 as Romani, 122 as Not found out and 1 as Hungarian.

Note on population: The difference values of population numbers in the table "Population statistic" and in the sections "Ethnicity" & "Religion" is caused by the use of various statistical methods.

The vast majority of the municipality's population consists of the local Roma community. In 2019, they constituted an estimated 100% of the local population.

=== Religion ===
Census 2021 (1+ %)
Religion	Number	Fraction
Roman Catholic Church	3111	96.05%
Not found out	88	2.72%
Total	3239	

In year 2021 was 3239 people by religion 3111 from Roman Catholic Church, 88 from Not found out, 29 from None, 6 from Christian Congregations in Slovakia, 4 from Greek Catholic Church and 1 from Evangelical Church.

== Sons and daughters of the town ==
- Michael Roth (born 1936), German engineer
