= Ken-ichi Kawarabayashi =

Japanese mathematician

Ken-ichi Kawarabayashi (Japanese: 河原林 健一, born 1975) is a Japanese graph theorist who works as a professor at the National Institute of Informatics and is known for his research on graph theory (particularly the theory of graph minors) and graph algorithms.

Kawarabayashi was born on May 22, 1975, in Tokyo. He earned a bachelor's degree in mathematics from Keio University in 1998, a master's degree from Keio in 2000, and a PhD from Keio in 2001, researching the Lovász–Woodall conjecture under the supervision of Katsuhiro Ota. After temporary positions at Vanderbilt University and under the supervision of Paul Seymour at Princeton University, he became an assistant professor at Tohoku University in 2003, and moved to the National Institute of Informatics in 2006.

In 2003, Kawarabayashi was one of three winners of the Kirkman Medal of the Institute of Combinatorics and its Applications, an award given by them annually to researchers within four years of their PhD. In 2015, he won the Spring Prize of the Mathematical Society of Japan, its highest honor. He was a keynote speaker at the 2015 International Colloquium on Automata, Languages and Programming. He was named as an ACM Fellow, in the 2025 class of fellows, "for his contributions to graph theory, graph algorithms, and their applications".
