= Joseph A. Thas =

Belgian mathematician

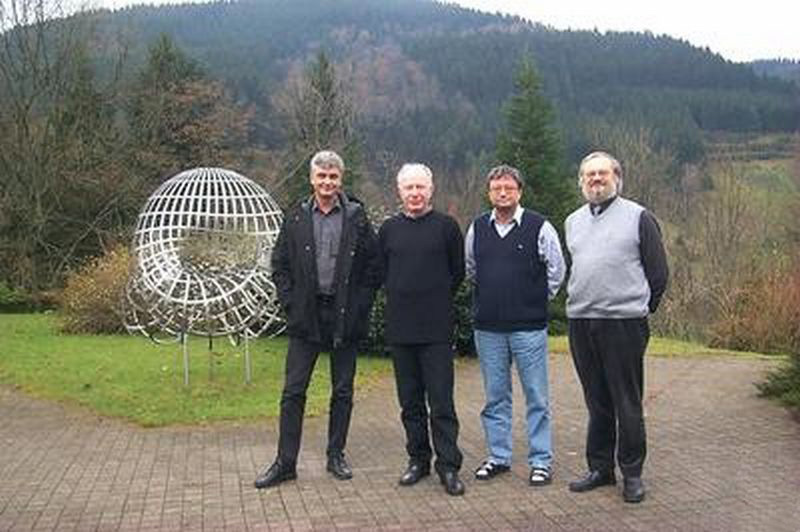
From left: Aart Blokhuis, James William Peter Hirschfeld, Dieter Jungnickel, and Joseph A. Thas, at the MFO, 2001

Joseph Adolphe François Thas (born 13 October 1944, Dilbeek, Belgium) is a Belgian mathematician, who works on combinatorics, incidence geometry and finite geometries.

Thas received in 1969 his PhD from Ghent University under Julien Bilo with thesis Een studie betreffende de projective rechte over de totale matrix algebra $M_3 (K)$ der 3x3-matrices met elementen in een algebraïsch afgesloten veld K. Thas showed how to extend projective geometry and cross-ratios with the concept of a projective line over a ring.

Thas is an emeritus professor at Ghent University.

== Awards and honors ==
In 1994 Thas received the Euler medal. In 1998 he gave an invited address at the International Congress of Mathematicians in Berlin with lecture Finite geometries, varieties and codes. He received in 1969 the prize of the Royal Academy of Sciences, Letters and Fine Arts of Belgium, in 1970 the Scientific Louis Empain Award and in the same year the François Deruyts prize of the Royal Academy of Belgium.

In 1988 he became a member of the Royal Flemish Academy of Belgium for Science and the Arts; he was vice-director of the Class of Sciences in 1998 and director in 1999. In 1999 he was awarded an Erskine Fellowship of the University of Canterbury, New Zealand, in 2008 he was Platinum Jubilee Lecturer at the Indian Statistical Institute, and in 2012 he became one of the inaugural fellows of the American Mathematical Society.

Recipient, Grand Officer of the Order of Leopold (Belgium)(Grootofficier in de Leopoldsorde) (2012)

== Selected works ==
- 1981: (with J. Bilo) Enkele aspecten van de theorie der axiomatische projectieve vlakken, Simon Stevin Supplement, Vol. 55
- 1984: (with Stanley E. Payne) Finite generalized quadrangles, Pitman, 2nd edition 2009, European Mathematical Society
- 1991: (with J. W. P. Hirschfeld) General Galois Geometries, Oxford University Press
- 1995: "Projective geometry over a finite field" and "Generalized Polygons" in F. Buekenhout, Handbook of Incidence Geometry, North-Holland
- 2006: (with Koen Thas & H. Van Maldeghem) Translation Generalized Quadrangles, World Scientific

(For a complete list of papers see Homepage in Ghent.)
