= Charles C. Lindner =

American mathematician (1938–2023)

Charles Curtis "Curt" Lindner (21 July 1938 – 21 February 2023) was an American mathematician who was interested in block designs in combinatorics such as Steiner triple systems.

Lindner was born in Tampa, Florida on 21 July 1938. He grew up in Decatur, Georgia where he graduated from Decatur High School in 1956. Lindner then was a part of the United States Army Reserve between 1956 and 1964. Lindner studied mathematics at Presbyterian College in Clinton, South Carolina, where he received his bachelor's degree in 1960. Lindner taught for a year at a high school in Jacksonville, Florida. Then he went to Emory University where he received his master's degree in 1963. After marrying, he taught for four years as an assistant professor at Coker College in Hartsville, South Carolina, a women's college. He received his doctorate from Emory University in 1969 under Trevor Evans, his dissertation Some Embedding Theorems for Partial Latin Squares. He became an assistant professor in 1969, an associate professor in 1973, and a professor at Auburn University in 1976. From 1985 to 1990, he was an alumni professor there, and since 1994 a distinguished university professor.

He taught regularly at the University of Queensland, where he held an honorary professorship since 1994. He was also an honorary professor at the Universita di Catania. He has been a visiting professor in Université de Montréal on several occasions and a visiting professor at the University of Messina, the University of Waterloo, the University of Newcastle in Australia, Georgia Institute of Technology, National Taiwan University, University of Canterbury in New Zealand, Universidad de Puerto Rico, Istanbul University, and McMaster University.

In 2013 he was awarded the Euler Medal.

On 10 March 1961, Lindner married Ann Richards. They had three sons: Charles Lindner, Curtis Lindner, and James Lindner.
