= Widukind Lenz =

German pediatrician, medical geneticist and dysmorphologist (1919–1995)

- Born: 4 February 1919; Eichenau, Bavaria, Germany
- Died: 25 February 1995 (aged 76)
- Known for: Recognizing the thalidomide syndrome
- Father: Fritz Lenz
- Relatives: Hanfried Lenz (brother)
- Scientific career
- Fields: Pediatrics, medical genetics, dysmorphology
- Workplaces: Eppendorfer Kinderklinik, Hamburg; University of Hamburg; Institute of Human Genetics, Münster

Widukind Lenz (4 February 1919, Eichenau, Bavaria – 25 February 1995) was a distinguished German pediatrician, medical geneticist and dysmorphologist who was among the first to recognize the thalidomide syndrome in 1961 and alert the world to the dangers of limb and other malformations due to the mother's exposure to this drug during pregnancy.

In the ensuing years, Lenz did much important work on the thalidomide syndrome. He also did work of value in clinical genetics and cytogenetics. He described a number of malformation syndromes, several of which bear his name today. He was an editor of the journal Human Genetics and published a textbook of medical genetics.

Lenz studied medicine from 1937 to 1943. Besides his studies he was a group leader in Hitlerjugend, a member of National Socialist German Students' League (the Nazi students' union) and became an active member of the SA. A possible shift to the SS 1941 was vetoed by his SA foremen. From 1944 till 1948 Lenz worked as a physician in Luftwaffe hospitals during World War II and then in a prisoner-of-war camp in England.

After stints in biochemistry in Göttingen and medicine in Kiel, he became physician-in-chief of the Eppendorfer Kinderklinik in 1952 and was named to the chair of pediatrics at the University of Hamburg in 1961. Lenz became director of the Institute of Human Genetics in Münster in 1965.

Widukind Lenz was the son of Fritz Lenz, also a geneticist, but one of an entirely different stripe. Fritz Lenz espoused eugenics and influenced the racial hygiene policies of the Third Reich. Widukind Lenz died respected as an eminent physician and a humanitarian.

He was the younger brother of mathematician Hanfried Lenz.
