= Michael Roth (cyberneticist) =

German engineer and academic

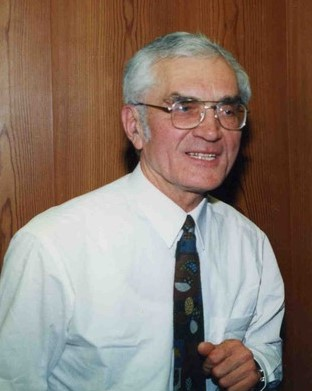
- Born: 18 June 1936; Lomnička, Czechoslovakia
- Died: 23 July 2019 (aged 83); Ilmenau, Germany
- Occupations: Engineer and Professor for Technical Cybernetics and computer engineering

Michael Roth (18 June 1936 – 23 July 2019) was a German engineer and professor of automation, specializing in microprocessor technology, computer science and sociology as well as philosophy of science. He was one of the pioneers in the area of computer engineering in Germany.

== Life ==
Roth was born in Lomnička, and originally completed his vocational training as a mechanic for agricultural machinery and as a programmer. He started his university studies in 1957 at the then Hochschule fuer Elektrotechnik Ilmenau in electrical engineering, with a specialization in control engineering under Karl Reinisch. He received his academic degree as a Diplom-Ingenieur (Dipl.-Ing.) in 1963. After that, he worked at the institute for computer engineering ("maschinelle Rechentechnik") as a scientific assistant. He successfully completed this work in 1967 earning a Doctorate degree as a Doktoringenieur (Dr.-Ing.). His dissertation was in the domain of computer engineering, focusing on the design of hybrid computers. This constituted an essential foundation for his later research. Subsequently, he finished additional studies at the Moscow Power Engineering Institute in 1967/68.

Roth was appointed associate professor at the TH Ilmenau in 1970, in the department of Technical and Biomedical Cybernetics ("Technische und Biomedizinische Kybernetik", TBK, Director: Karl Reinisch). In cooperation with expert committees from the Chamber of Technology ("Kammer der Technik", KdT, the organization of engineers, technicians, and researchers of the GDR) and the electronics industry of Thuringia, he developed the new special field of microcomputer technology, which he also introduced as an independent subject, publishing specialized reference books in several editions.

Roth stimulated the launch of this technology not only through his research and development work, but also through his involvement in continuous education for this industrial technology as well as through the publication of specialized books. As a researcher, he focused on questions concerning the development of components and tools for intelligent automation systems.

In 1978, he was appointed Professor for Automation and Technical Cybernetics ("Automatik und Technische Kybernetik") at the TH Ilmenau. This appointment spoke highly of his knowledge and his wealth of experience. His lectures and his textbooks extended the training of engineers with degrees in microprocessor technology – at the time, microprocessor technology was a rare specialization in the German-speaking area.

His cooperation with other professors – one of them being in the data centre with its director, Reinhold Schönefeld – led to extensive industry-level research and internship opportunities in microprocessor technology with the TH Ilmenau. These opportunities were considered unique when compared to other university facilities in the German-speaking area. Roth thus contributed to establishing research and development at the department of Technical and Biomedical Cybernetics, and making it thrive. In parallel, he worked on the technology transfer to the surrounding computer businesses.

During his professional activities, Roth developed various microcontroller applications and implementations. Through this, he gained experience with programming languages, the usage of the accompanying development tools as well as the hardware and software components. Systems for visualization were used to efficiently communicate between man and machine. Further work on real-life applications and objects for demonstration purposes extended his knowledge and experience in the area of programming. He also gained a sound skill level in the area of data communication and related subdomains.

By no means had Roth ever considered this field as being technologically finalized. As such, he continuously worked in close contact with industry and research partners to scientifically advance future development. Through his committee work in the Informatics Society of the GDR and specific publications of books and magazines, he contributed to an increased appreciation of the new field of microprocessor technology in East Germany.

Furthermore, since his early years, Roth had been interested in a higher-level view of the evolution of science. In 1986, he completed his Habilitation at the TU Dresden in the field of the philosophy of science.

== Scientific roles ==
Roth started as the research area lead of the aforementioned department TBK; he then became its director. On the basis of his specialized research work, he became a co-founder of the specialized studies „Computer Engineering“. In addition to that, he was the founder of the postgraduate degree of an engineer with a specialization „Microprocessor technology“.

Roth was the founder and editor of the magazine „Mikroprozessortechnik“ at the East German publishing company Verlag Technik Berlin. In an evening talk at a technical committee conference of the Chamber of Technology (KdT) in Angelroda in April 1982, he described the tedious processes for founding this magazine under the conditions in the GDR: For 15 years he made efforts until a small number of copies of „Mikroprozessortechnik“ were allowed to be released. It was forbidden to use the word „Informatik“, as Günter Mittag, a member of the Politbüro of the SED considered this a term of West German ideology. The argument of a limited quota of paper available to the publisher had to be overcome, as well as the criticism that the publishing company VEB Verlag Technik had not published a new magazine for 28 years.

His work as co-founder of the magazine Ethics and Social Sciences ("Ethik und Sozialwissenschaften", a forum for a culture of deliberation) at the West German publishing company Westdeutscher Verlag illustrates his ability for unconventional thinking and his interest in questions concerning the future.

For many years, Roth was the chair of the Thuringia subdivision of the Verband Hochschule und Wissenschaft (Association for Higher Education and Science, VHW) in the German Civil Service Federation, as well as a member of the federal board of the VHW in Bonn (chair at the time: Reinhard Kuhnert). This professional association of professors, university lecturers and scientific assistants at universities and institutes of higher education was founded in November 1990 in Thuringia to engage employees and civil servants, where the VHW as part of the German Civil Service Federation also has the right of hearing in legislative procedures and the collective bargaining law.

Roth contributed as an expert to the advisory panel „Delphi-Prognose“ of the Fraunhofer Society.

== Fields ==
Michael Roth worked in a wide variety of fields:

- Automation Technology
- Technical Cybernetics
- Computer Engineering
- Computer Science and Sociology
- Information Society
- Knowledge Economy
- Evolution of Society as well as
- Universities and higher education institutions.

Roth gave numerous lectures about his research results at scientific conferences and events, whose realization he partially encouraged and organized himself. His scientific publications at the same time reflect his teamwork and consist of more than 100 pieces of work, including several books with up to 5 editions. In parallel, he participated in various reports, providing expert opinion.

== Bibliography (selection) ==
- Verwendung nichtlinearer Strukturen in steuerbaren Hochgeschwindigkeits-Operationsverstärkern. Dissertation, TH Ilmenau, Fakultät für naturwissenschaftlich-technische Grundlagen, Ilmenau 1967.
- Elektronische Bauelemente der technischen Kybernetik. In: Funktionseinheiten der technischen Kybernetik, 8. Lehrbrief (F 77/8), Lehrbriefe für das Hochschulfernstudium, hrsg. von der Zentralstelle für das Hochschulfernstudium des Ministeriums für Hoch- und Fachschulwesen 1974.
- Elektronische analoge und hybride Funktionseinheiten. In: Funktionseinheiten der technischen Kybernetik, 10. Lehrbrief (F 77/10), Lehrbriefe für das Hochschulfernstudium, hrsg. von der Zentralstelle für das Hochschulfernstudium des Ministeriums für Hoch- und Fachschulwesen 1974.
- mit Werner Kriesel: Elektronische digitale Funktionseinheiten. In: Funktionseinheiten der technischen Kybernetik, 11. Lehrbrief (F 77/11), Lehrbriefe für das Hochschulfernstudium, hrsg. von der Zentralstelle für das Hochschulfernstudium des Ministeriums für Hoch- und Fachschulwesen 1974.
- Mikroprozessoren. Wesen, Technologie, Weiterentwicklung, Aufbau, Programmierung, Anwendung. Wissenschaftliche Zeitschrift und Kammer der Technik-Hochschulsektion an der TH Ilmenau, Ilmenau 1977, 2. Und 3. Auflage 1978, 4. Auflage 1979, 5. Auflage, KDT-Bezirksverband, Suhl 1980.
- mit Todor Shergowski, Walter Krug: Speicherschaltkreise der Mikroprozessortechnik. Institut für Film, Bild und Ton, Berlin 1982.
- mit Todor Shergowski, Walter Krug: Funktionsblöcke ausgewählter Mikroprozessoren. Institut für Film, Bild und Ton, Berlin 1982.
- mit Todor Shergowski, Ilse Renner: Peripherie-Schaltkreise der Mikroprozessortechnik. Institut für Film, Bild und Ton, Berlin 1983.
- Evolution und Kooperation – Mensch und intelligenter Automat (Analysen und Hypothesen). Habilitation (Dissertation B), Technische Universität, Dresden 1986.
- Michael Roth (Hrsg.): Beiträge zur Mikrocomputertechnik. Verlag Technik, Berlin 1986, ISBN 3-341-00150-6.
- mit Helga Schwietzke: Mikroprozessor-Architekturen. Institut für Film, Bild und Ton, Berlin 1988.
- Die intelligente Maschine – der Computer als Experte. Urania-Verlag, Leipzig; Jena; Berlin 1988, ISBN 3-332-00219-8.
- mit Klaus Kaplick, Dieter Orlamünder, Heinz Bergmann: Computertechnik von A bis Z. Hrsg.: Jochen Horn. Fachbuchverlag Leipzig 1990, ISBN 3-343-00563-0.
- Universitäten – Hochschulen: akademisch – technologisch? Verband Hochschule und Wissenschaft, VHW-Mitteilungen 1/1994.
- Grundlegende Merkmale der gesellschaftlichen Evolution zur Wissensgesellschaft. Verband Hochschule und Wissenschaft, VHW-Mitteilungen 10/1997.
- Postulate zum Wandel der High-Tech-Industriegesellschaft zur High-Org-Wissensgesellschaft. In: Christiane Floyd, Christian Fuchs, Wolfgang Hofkirchner (Hrsg.): Stufen zur Informationsgesellschaft. Festschrift zum 65. Geburtstag von Klaus Fuchs-Kittowski. Peter Lang – Europäischer Verlag der Wissenschaften, Frankfurt am Main; Berlin; Bern; Bruxelles; New York; Oxford; Wien 2002, ISBN 3-631-37642-1.
- Die Zukunft der „Universität in der Wissensgesellschaft“. In: Klaus Fuchs-Kittowski; Rainer E. Zimmermann (Hrsg.): Kybernetik, Logik, Semiotik. Philosophische Sichtweisen. Tagung aus Anlass des 100. Geburtstages von Georg Klaus. trafo Wissenschaftsverlag, Berlin 2015 (Abhandlungen der Leibniz-Sozietät der Wissenschaften, Bd. 40), S. 425–440, ISBN 978-3-86464-095-7.
- Immunsysteme in der biologischen, informationstechnischen und sozialen Evolution. In: Frank Fuchs-Kittowski; Werner Kriesel (Hrsg.): Informatik und Gesellschaft. Festschrift zum 80. Geburtstag von Klaus Fuchs-Kittowski. Peter Lang Internationaler Verlag der Wissenschaften, PL Academic Research, Frankfurt a. M.; Bern; Bruxelles; New York; Oxford; Warszawa; Wien 2016, ISBN 978-3-631-66719-4 (Print), E-ISBN 978-3-653-06277-9 (E-Book).

== Literature ==
- Heinrich Kindler: Aufgabensammlung zur Regelungstechnik. Verlag Technik Berlin, Oldenbourg-Verlag München, Wien, 1964 (mit H. Buchta und H.-H. Wilfert).
- Karl Reinisch: Kybernetische Grundlagen und Beschreibung kontinuierlicher Systeme. Verlag Technik Berlin 1974.
- Horst Völz: Elektronik. Grundlagen, Prinzipien, Zusammenhänge. Akademie-Verlag, Berlin 1974, 2. Auflage 1979, 1002 S.
- Wolf Martin: Mikrocomputer in der Prozessdatenverarbeitung. Aufbau und Einsatz der Mikrocomputer zur Überwachung, Steuerung und Regelung. Carl Hanser Verlag, München, Wien 1977, ISBN 3-446-12373-3.
- Heinz Töpfer, Werner Kriesel: Funktionseinheiten der Automatisierungstechnik – elektrisch, pneumatisch, hydraulisch. Verlag Technik, Berlin und VDI-Verlag, Düsseldorf 1977, 5. Auflage 1988, ISBN 3-341-00290-1.
- Albert Jugel: Mikroprozessorsysteme. Verlag Technik, Berlin 1978.
- Wolfgang Schwarz, Gernot Meyer, Dietrich Eckhardt: Mikrorechner. Wirkungsweise, Programmierung, Applikation. Verlag Technik, Berlin 1980, 2. Auflage 1981.
- Wolfgang Fritzsch: Prozessrechentechnik. Automatisierte Systeme mit Prozess- und Mikroprozessrechnern. Verlag Technik, Berlin 1981, 2.Auflage 1983, 3. Auflage 1986.
- Klaus Kabitzsch: Mikrorechner in der Automatisierungspraxis. Akademie-Verlag, Berlin 1987, ISBN 3-05-500243-1.
- Manfred Thoma: Heinz Töpfer 60 Jahre. In: Automatisierungstechnik, München. Jg. 38, Nr. 7, 1990, S. 245–246.
- Peter Neumann u. a.: SPS-Standard: IEC 1131 : Programmierung in verteilten Automatisierungssystemen. Oldenbourg-Industrieverlag, München; Wien 1995, 2. Auflage 1998, 3. Auflage 2000, ISBN 978-3-8356-7005-1.
- Werner Kriesel, Hans Rohr, Andreas Koch: Geschichte und Zukunft der Mess- und Automatisierungstechnik. VDI-Verlag, Düsseldorf 1995, ISBN 3-18-150047-X.
- Lothar Starke: Vom Hydraulischen Regler zum Prozessleitsystem. Die Erfolgsgeschichte der Askania-Werke Berlin und der Geräte- und Regler-Werke Teltow. 140 Jahre Industriegeschichte, Tradition und Zukunft. Berliner Wissenschafts-Verlag, Berlin 2009, ISBN 978-3-8305-1715-3.
- Hans-Joachim Zander, Georg Bretthauer: Prof. Heinz Töpfer zum 80. Geburtstag. In: Automatisierungstechnik, München. Jg. 58, Nr. 7, 2010, S. 413–415.
- Wolfgang Weller: Automatisierungstechnik im Wandel der Zeit – Entwicklungsgeschichte eines faszinierenden Fachgebiets. Verlag epubli GmbH Berlin, 2013, ISBN 978-3-8442-5487-7 sowie als E-Book.
- Hans-Joachim Zander: Steuerung ereignisdiskreter Prozesse. Neuartige Methoden zur Prozessbeschreibung und zum Entwurf von Steuerungsalgorithmen. Springer Vieweg Verlag, Wiesbaden 2015, ISBN 978-3-658-01381-3, E-Book-ISBN 978-3-658-01382-0.
- Tilo Heimbold: Einführung in die Automatisierungstechnik. Automatisierungssysteme, Komponenten, Projektierung und Planung. Fachbuchverlag Leipzig im Carl Hanser Verlag München 2015, ISBN 978-3-446-42675-7, E-Book-ISBN 978-3-446-43135-5.
- Ulrich Busch, Michael Thomas (Hrsg.): Ein Vierteljahrhundert Deutsche Einheit – Facetten einer unvollendeten Integration. trafo Wissenschaftsverlag, Berlin 2015 (Abhandlungen der Leibniz-Sozietät der Wissenschaften, Bd. 42), ISBN 978-3-86464-100-8.
- Werner Kriesel: Zukunfts-Modelle für Informatik, Automatik und Kommunikation. In: Frank Fuchs-Kittowski; Werner Kriesel (Hrsg.): Informatik und Gesellschaft. Festschrift zum 80. Geburtstag von Klaus Fuchs-Kittowski. Peter Lang Internationaler Verlag der Wissenschaften, PL Academic Research, Frankfurt a. M.; Bern; Bruxelles; New York; Oxford; Warszawa; Wien 2016, ISBN 978-3-631-66719-4 (Print), E-ISBN 978-3-653-06277-9 (E-Book).
