= Danzer set =

Set of points touching all convex bodies of unit volume

Unsolved problem in mathematics
Does a Danzer set with bounded density or bounded separation exist?
More unsolved problems in mathematics

Construction of a two-dimensional Danzer set with growth rate $O(n^2\log n)$ from overlaid rectangular grids of aspect ratio 1:1, 1:9, 1:81, etc.

In geometry, a Danzer set is a set of points that touches every convex body of unit volume. Ludwig Danzer asked whether it is possible for such a set to have bounded density. Several variations of this problem remain unsolved.

== Formulation ==
A Danzer set, in an n-dimensional Euclidean space, is a set of points in the space that has a non-empty intersection with every convex body whose n-dimensional volume is one. The whole space is itself a Danzer set, but it is possible for a Danzer set to be a discrete set with only finitely many points in any bounded area. Danzer's question asked whether, more strongly, the average number of points per unit area could be bounded.

One way to define the problem more formally is to consider the growth rate of a set $S$ in $d$-dimensional Euclidean space, defined as the function that maps a real number $r$ to the number of points of $S$ that are within distance $r$ of the origin. Danzer's question is whether it is possible for a Danzer set to have growth rate $O(r^d)$, expressed in big O notation. If so, this would equal the growth rate of well-spaced point sets like the integer lattice (which is not a Danzer set).

An equivalent formulation involves the density of a set $S$, defined as
$$\limsup_{r\to\infty} \frac{|S\cap B_d(r)|}{V_d(r)},$$
where $B_d(r)$ denotes the Euclidean ball of radius $r$ in $d$-dimensional Euclidean space, centered at the origin, and $V_d(r)$ denotes its volume. Danzer's question asks whether there exists a Danzer set of bounded density or, alternatively, whether every set of bounded density has arbitrarily high-volume convex sets disjoint from it.

Instead of asking for a set of bounded density that intersects arbitrary convex sets of unit volume, it is equivalent to ask for a set of bounded density that intersects all ellipsoids of unit volume, or all hyperrectangles of unit volume. For instance, in the plane, the shapes of these intersecting sets can be restricted to ellipses, or to rectangles. However, these shapes do not necessarily have their sides or axes parallel to the coordinate axes.

== Partial results ==
It is possible to construct a Danzer set of growth rate that is within a polylogarithmic factor of $O(r^d)$. For instance, overlaying rectangular grids whose cells have constant volume but differing aspect ratios can achieve a growth rate of $O(n^d\log^{d-1}n)$. A construction for Danzer sets is known with a somewhat slower growth rate, $O(r^d \log r)$. This construction is based on deep results of Marina Ratner in ergodic theory (Ratner's theorems). Because both the overlaid grids and the improved construction have growth rates faster than $O(r^d)$, these sets do not have bounded density, and the answer to Danzer's question remains unknown.

Although the existence of a Danzer set of bounded density remains open, it is possible to restrict the classes of point sets that may be Danzer sets in other ways than by their densities, ruling out certain types of solution to Danzer's question. In particular, a Danzer set cannot be the union of finitely many lattices, it cannot be generated by choosing a point in each tile of a substitution tiling (in the same position for each tile of the same type), and it cannot be generated by the cut-and-project method for constructing aperiodic tilings. Therefore, the vertices of the pinwheel tiling and Penrose tiling are not Danzer sets.

== Variations ==
=== Bounded coverage ===
A strengthened variation of the problem, posed by Timothy Gowers, asks whether there exists a Danzer set $S$ for which there is a finite bound $C$ on the number of points of intersection between $S$ and any convex body of unit volume. This version has been solved: it is impossible for a Danzer set with this property to exist.

=== Separation ===
Another strengthened variation of the problem, still unsolved, is Conway's dead fly problem. John Horton Conway recalled that, as a child, he slept in a room with wallpaper whose flower pattern resembled an array of dead flies, and that he would try to find convex regions that did not have a dead fly in them. In Conway's formulation, the question is whether there exists a Danzer set in which the points of the set (the dead flies) are separated at a bounded distance from each other. Such a set would necessarily also have an upper bound on the distance from each point of the plane to a dead fly (in order to touch all circles of unit area), so it would form a Delone set, a set with both lower and upper bounds on the spacing of the points. It would also necessarily have growth rate $O(r^d)$, so if it exists then it would also solve the original version of Danzer's problem. Conway offered a $1000 prize for a solution to his problem, as part of a set of problems also including Conway's 99-graph problem, the analysis of sylver coinage, and the thrackle conjecture.

== See also ==
- Heilbronn triangle problem, on sets of points that do not form triangles of small area
- Minkowski's theorem, that every unit-volume closed convex body that is centrally symmetric around the origin contains a nonzero point of the half-integer lattice
