= Hanfried Lenz =

German mathematician (1916–2013)

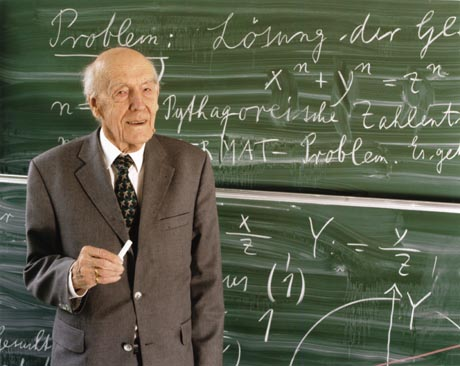
- Born: 22 April 1916; Munich, Germany
- Died: 1 June 2013 (aged 97); Berlin, Germany
- Education: University of Tübingen; Technical University of Munich
- Known for: Lenz-Barlotti classification
- Awards: Euler Medal (1995)
- Scientific career
- Fields: Geometry, combinatorics
- Thesis: Zurückführung einiger Integrale auf einfachere mit Anwendungen auf Abbildungsaufgaben (1952)
- Doctoral advisor: Josef Lense
- Doctoral students: Ludwig Danzer; Dieter Jungnickel

Hanfried Lenz (22 April 1916 – 1 June 2013) was a German mathematician, who is mainly known for his work in geometry and combinatorics.

Hanfried Lenz was the eldest son of Fritz Lenz an influential German geneticist, who is associated with Eugenics and hence also with the Nazi racial policies during the Third Reich. He was also the older brother of Widukind Lenz, a geneticist. He started to study mathematics and physics at the University of Tübingen, but interrupted his studies from 1935 to 1937 to do a (at this time, in Weimar Republic voluntary) military service. After that he continued to study at the Technical University of Munich, the Free University of Berlin, and Leipzig University. In 1939 when World War II broke out in Europe, he became a soldier in the western front and during a vacation he passed the exams for his teacher certification. He married Helene Ranke in 1943 and 1943–45 he worked on radar technology in a laboratory near Berlin.

After World War II Hanfried Lenz was classified as a "follower" by the denazification process. He started to work as a math and physics teacher in Munich and in 1949 he became an assistant at the Technical University of Munich. He received his PhD in 1951 and his Habilitation in 1953. He worked as a lecturer until he became an associate professor in 1959. In 1969 he finally became a full professor at the Free University of Berlin and worked there until his retirement in 1984.

He was also politically active and in connection with his opposition to the rebuilding of the German army in the early 50s, he became a member of the Social Democratic Party (SPD) in 1954. Later, partially due to being alienated by the student movement of the '60s, his leanings became more conservative again and in 1972 he left the SPD to join the Christian Democratic Union.

Hanfried Lenz is known for his work on the classification of projective planes and in 1954 he showed how one can introduce affine spaces axiomatically without constructing them from projective spaces or vector spaces. This result is now known as the theorem of Lenz. During his later years he also worked in the area of combinatorics and published a book on design theory (together with Dieter Jungnickel and Thomas Beth).

In 1995 the Institute of Combinatorics and its Applications awarded the Euler Medal to Hanfried Lenz.
