= Karl Reinisch =

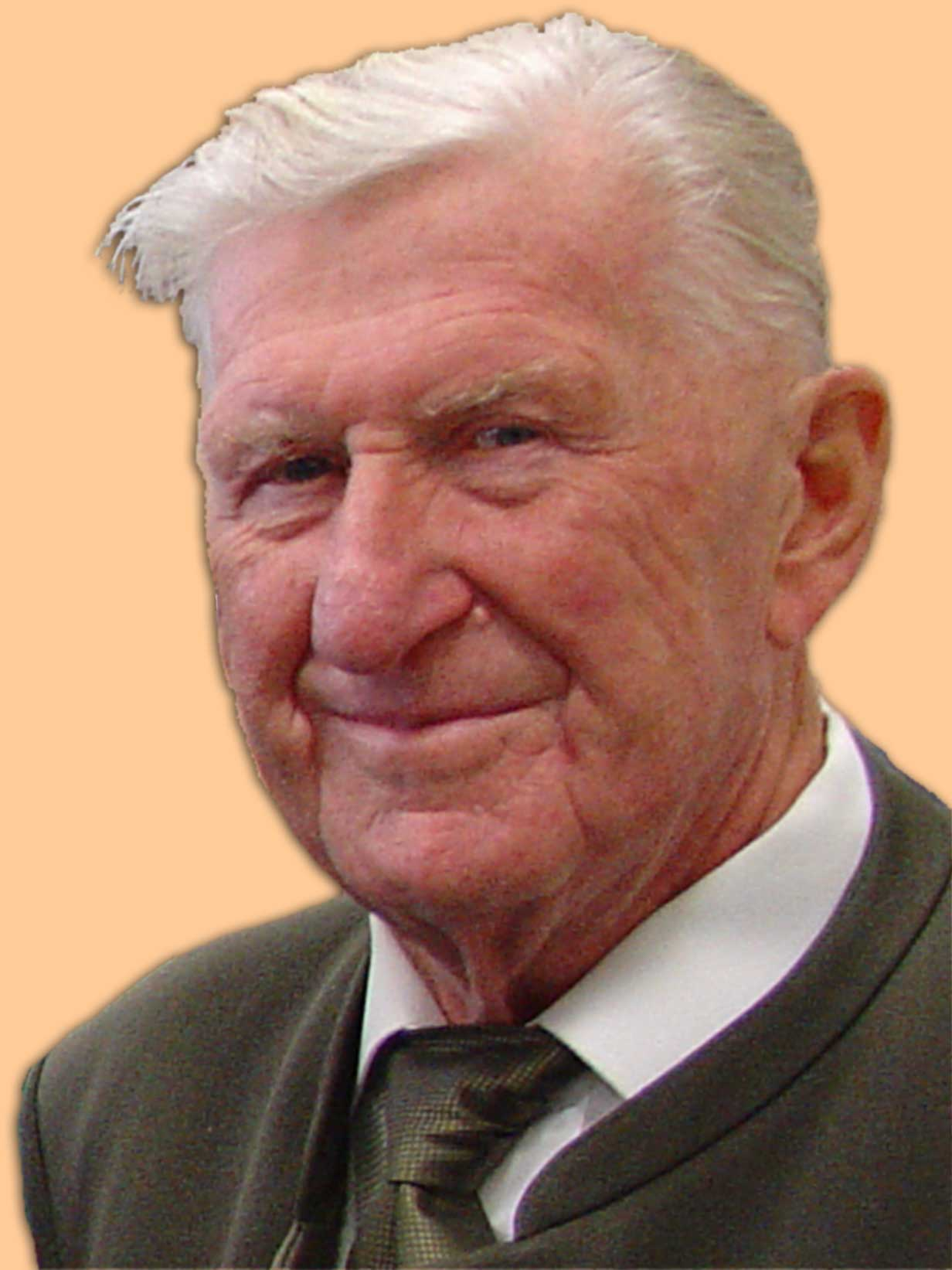
- Born: 21 August 1921; Dresden, Germany
- Died: 24 January 2007 (aged 85); Ilmenau, Germany
- Occupation: Engineer

Content in this edit is translated from the existing German Wikipedia article at de:Karl Reinisch; see its history for attribution.

Karl Reinisch (21 August 1921 – 24 January 2007) was a German electrical engineer and professor for control engineering in Ilmenau. Under his lead, a solid foundation for automation and system technology for cybernetics was developed at the Technische Universität Ilmenau. For many years, he was active at the International Federation of Automatic Control (IFAC).

== Life ==
Karl Reinisch received his Abitur in 1940, and for the next five years served in World War II. Between 1946 and 1950 he studied electrical engineering with a focus on extra-low voltage at the Technische Universität Dresden, working with Heinrich Barkhausen and Georg Mierdel. The latter convinced Reinisch to move into the area of control engineering. Immediately after he finished studying, he became a scientific assistant, later "Oberassistent" (head assistant) for general electrical engineering, and between 1951 and 1953 received a university teaching position for theoretical electrical engineering. He gained further teaching experience in the subject of control engineering in Magdeburg, where an institute for control engineering was being formed (Sponsor: Heinrich Wilhelmi).

Reinisch's dissertation from 1957 on the subject of optimization of control cycles is considered the first thesis on control engineering in the GDR. In the same year, the German Academy of Sciences at Berlin created a position for control engineering in Dresden (Led by: Heinrich Kindler). Karl Reinisch accepted the position to develop and lead the department "Elektrische Regelungssysteme" (electrical control systems). Other departments were "Nichtelektrische Regelungssysteme" (non-electrical control systems) and "Schaltsysteme" (combinational / sequential circuits) (Led by: Siegfried Pilz).

In 1960 he was appointed to the Hochschule für Elektrotechnik Ilmenau, later TH Ilmenau, and today TU Ilmenau where he developed the new field of control engineering at the faculty for extra-low voltage. In 1965 he finished his Habilitation at the TU Dresden, and in the same year was designated Professor at the TH Ilmenau. In the year 1968 Siegfried Pilz from the academy in Dresden followed him to Ilmenau, department of "Informationstechnik" (information technology), Hans-Joachim Zander became his successor.

As part of the reform of the higher education institutions in 1968, Karl Reinisch initiated the merger of four institutes into the newly created department for technical and biomedical cybernetics. He led the Institute for Control Engineering that he established, and the Faculty for Automatic Control that emerged from it in 1968 until his retirement from his academic career in 1986. His work extended to non-technical systems as well. In the 1970s he began to teach and research the Dynamics and Simulation of ecological Systems, the basis for a field of TU Dresden that was established later, and that belongs to the Faculty of Environmental Sciences. In 1987, TU Dresden awarded him with the Doctor honoris causa for his achievements.

Even after his retirement, Reinisch remained active as a scientist. In 1995, he became a full member of the "Akademie gemeinnütziger Wissenschaften zu Erfurt" (Academy of charitable sciences in Erfurt). Until 1996 he continued to give lectures for the Institute of Automation and System Technology at the Technical University of Ilmenau. Several professors emerged from the occupational sphere of Karl Reinisch: Ulrich Engmann, Manfred Günther, Tatjana Lange, Jan Lunze, G. Otto, H. Puta, Michael Roth, Josef Sponer, and others.

Karl Reinisch's impact went far beyond his professional work. For example, he organized ecumenic events on philosophical and religious questions. At the time of the GDR those took place in the rooms of his church congregation and brought together the representatives of very different directions. During the peaceful revolution of 1989 and afterwards, his advice and engagement were in demand in a larger setting. On 24 January 2007, following a long and serious illness, Karl Reinisch died at the age of 85.

== Achievements ==
Karl Reinisch established a system-technologically characterized Control engineering school (in the sense of the Cybernetics of Norbert Wiener). His work focused on the optimal execution of complex processes in decentral, and especially hierarchical structures, applying this to water resource management (control of reservoirs) and agriculture.

For more than 15 years he was active as a representative of the "Wissenschaftlich-Technische Gesellschaft Mess- und Automatisierungstechnik (WGMA)" (Scientific-technological society of measurement and automation engineering) of the Chamber of Technology ("Kammer der Technik", KdT, the organization of engineers, technicians and researchers of the GDR) in responsible positions at the International Federation of Automatic Control (IFAC). With his retirement in 1986, Reinisch was awarded "Hervorragender Hochschullehrer" (exceptional university professor). Starting in 1989, Karl Reinisch took part in evaluating and structurally transforming the former Technische Hochschule Ilmenau into the Technical University of Ilmenau.

== Bibliography (selection) ==
- Kybernetische Grundlagen und Beschreibung kontinuierlicher Systeme. Verlag Technik, Berlin 1974, 3. Auflage 1996, ISBN 3-341-01167-6.
- Als Hrsg.: Large scale systems - theory and applications. IFAC symposia series 9, 1990.
- Analyse und Synthese kontinuierlicher Steuerungs- und Regelungssysteme. Verlag Technik, Berlin 1996, ISBN 3-341-01167-6.
- Theorie der automatischen Steuerung. In: Eugen Philippow (Hrsg.): Taschenbuch der Elektrotechnik. Band 2, Verlag Technik, Berlin, Carl Hanser Verlag, München 1977.

== Literature ==
- Leonhard, A.: Die selbsttätige Regelung in der Elektrotechnik. Springer-Verlag, Berlin 1940.
- Oldenbourg, R. C., Sartorius, H.: Dynamik selbsttätiger Regelungen. Oldenbourg-Verlag, München, Berlin 1944.
- Schäfer, O.: Grundlagen der selbsttätigen Regelung. Technischer Verlag Heinz Resch, Gräfelfing 1953, 7. Auflage 1974.
- Oppelt, W.: Kleines Handbuch technischer Regelvorgänge. Verlag Chemie, Weinheim 1954, 5. Auflage Verlag Chemie, Weinheim und Verlag Technik, Berlin 1972. ISBN 3-527-25347-5.
- Schlitt, H.: Stochastische Vorgänge in linearen und nichtlinearen Regelkreisen. Vieweg Verlag, Braunschweig, Verlag Technik, Berlin 1968.
- Töpfer, H.; Kriesel, W.: Funktionseinheiten der Automatisierungstechnik – elektrisch, pneumatisch, hydraulisch. Verlag Technik, Berlin und VDI-Verlag, Düsseldorf 1977, 5. Auflage 1988, ISBN 3-341-00290-1.
- Ulrich Korn, Hans-Helmut Wilfert: Mehrgrößenregelungen – moderne Entwurfsprinzipien im Zeit- und Frequenzbereich. Verlag Technik, Berlin und Springer-Verlag, Wien; New York 1982, ISBN 3-211-95802-9.
- Dittmann, F.: Zur Entwicklung der "Allgemeinen Regelungskunde" in Deutschland. Hermann Schmidt und die "Denkschrift zur Gründung eines Institutes für Regelungstechnik". In: Wiss. Zeitschrift TU Dresden. Jg. 44, Nr. 6, 1995, S. 88–94.
- Kriesel, W.; Rohr, H.; Koch, A.: Geschichte und Zukunft der Mess- und Automatisierungstechnik. VDI-Verlag, Düsseldorf 1995, ISBN 3-18-150047-X.
- Fasol, K. H.: Hermann Schmidt, Naturwissenschaftler und Philosoph – Pionier der Allgemeinen Regelkreislehre in Deutschland. In: Automatisierungstechnik, München. Jg. 49, Nr. 3, 2001, S. 138–144.
- Weller, W.: Automatisierungstechnik im Überblick. Beuth Verlag Berlin, Wien, Zürich 2008, ISBN 978-3-410-16760-0 und als E-Book.
- Starke, L.: Vom Hydraulischen Regler zum Prozessleitsystem. Die Erfolgsgeschichte der Askania-Werke Berlin und der Geräte- und Regler-Werke Teltow. 140 Jahre Industriegeschichte, Tradition und Zukunft. Berliner Wissenschafts-Verlag, Berlin 2009, ISBN 978-3-8305-1715-3.
- Reinschke, K. J.: Verbindungen über das DDR-Territorium hinaus. Erinnerungen an Heinrich Kindler, erster Professor für Regelungstechnik an der TH Dresden. In: Dresdner UniversitätsJournal. Nr. 20, 2009, S. 4.
- Reinschke, K. J.: Erinnerung an Heinrich Kindler, erster Professor für Regelungstechnik an der TH Dresden. In: Automatisierungstechnik, München. Jg. 58, Nr. 06, 2010, S. 345–347.
- Weller, W.: Automatisierungstechnik im Wandel der Zeit – Entwicklungsgeschichte eines faszinierenden Fachgebiets. Verlag epubli GmbH Berlin, 2013, ISBN 978-3-8442-5487-7.
- Kriesel, W.: Prof. Hans-Joachim Zander zum 80. Geburtstag. In: Automatisierungstechnik, München. Jg. 61, H. 10, 2013, S. 722–724.
- teNeumann, P.: Automatisierungstechnik an der Magdeburger Alma Mater. In: Der Maschinen- und Anlagenbau in der Region Magdeburg zu Beginn des 21. Jahrhunderts. Zukunft aus Tradition. Verlag Delta-D, Axel Kühling, Magdeburg 2014, S. 215-219, ISBN 978-3-935831-51-2.
- Kriesel, W.: Zukunfts-Modelle für Informatik, Automatik und Kommunikation. In: Fuchs-Kittowski, Frank; Kriesel, Werner (Hrsg.): Informatik und Gesellschaft. Festschrift zum 80. Geburtstag von Klaus Fuchs-Kittowski. Frankfurt a. M., Bern, Bruxelles, New York, Oxford, Warszawa, Wien: Peter Lang Internationaler Verlag der Wissenschaften, PL Academic Research 2016, ISBN 978-3-631-66719-4 (Print), E-ISBN 978-3-653-06277-9 (E-Book).
