= Lovász–Woodall conjecture =

Conjecture on the existence of a cycle in a graph which passes through specified edges

An illustration of the Lovász–Woodall conjecture in the Petersen graph: the graph is 3-connected, and 3 edges lie on a common cycle.

In graph theory, the Lovász–Woodall conjecture is a long-standing problem on cycles in graphs. It says:

If G is a k-connected graph and L is a set of k independent edges in G, then G has a cycle containing L, unless k is odd and L is an edge cut.

It was proposed independently by László Lovász in 1974 and by D. R. Woodall in 1977.

== Background and motivation ==
Many results in graph theory, starting with Menger's theorem, guarantee the existence of paths or cycles in a k-connected graph. For 2-connected graphs, Menger's theorem is equivalent to the statement that any two vertices lie on a common cycle. A theorem of G. A. Dirac generalizes this claim: if a graph is k-connected for k ≥ 2, then for every set of k vertices in the graph there is a cycle that passes through all the vertices in the set.

Another corollary of Menger's theorem is that in 2-connected graphs, any two edges lie on a common cycle. The proof, however, does not generalize to the corresponding statement for k edges in a k-connected graph; rather, Menger's theorem can be used to show that in a k-connected graph, given any 2 edges and k − 2 vertices, there is a cycle passing through all of them.

There is one obstacle to the stronger claim that in a k-connected graph G, given any set L of k edges, there should be a cycle containing L. Suppose that the edges in L form an edge cut: the vertices of G can be separated into two sets A and B such that the edges in L all join a vertex in A to a vertex in B, and are the only edges to do so. Then any cycle in G can only use an even number of edges of L: it must cross from A to B and from B back to A an equal number of times. If k is odd, this means that no cycle can contain all of L.

The Lovász–Woodall conjecture states that this is the only obstacle: given any set L of k edges, there is a cycle containing L, except in the case that k is odd and L is an edge cut.

Woodall proposed the conjecture as one of several possible statements that would imply a conjecture made by Claude Berge: given a k-connected graph G with independence number α(G), and any subgraph F of G with at most k − α(G) edges whose components are all paths, G has a Hamiltonian cycle containing F. In 1982, Roland Häggkvist and Carsten Thomassen proved Berge's conjecture by proving one of the weaker statements proposed by Woodall.

== Partial results ==
As mentioned above, the k = 2 case of the Lovász–Woodall conjecture follows from Menger's theorem. The k = 3 case was given as an exercise by Lovász. After the conjecture was made, it was proven for k = 4 by Péter L. Erdős and E. Győri and independently by Michael V. Lomonosov., and for k = 5 by Daniel P. Sanders.

Other partial progress toward the conjecture has included versions of the result with a stronger assumption on connectivity. Woodall's paper included a proof that the conclusion of the conjecture holds if G is (2k − 2)-connected, and in 1977, Thomassen proved that the conjecture holds if G is (3k − 1)/2-connected. In 1982, Häggkvist and Thomassen proved that the conjecture holds if G is (k + 1)-connected.

In 2002, Ken-ichi Kawarabayashi proved that under the hypotheses of the conjecture, L is either contained in a cycle of G or in two disjoint cycles.

== Current status ==
In two publications in 2002 and 2008, Kawarabayashi claimed to have a proof on the conjecture, giving an outline for the proof and leaving several steps to future publications, but the full proof has not been published since.
