= Horst Sachs =

German mathematician

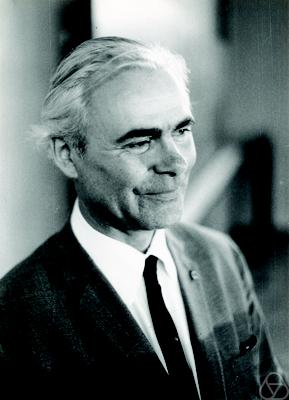
- Born: 27 March 1927; Magdeburg, Germany
- Died: 25 April 2016 (aged 89); Ilmenau, Germany
- Education: Martin Luther University Halle-Wittenberg
- Known for: Sachs subgraph
- Scientific career
- Fields: Mathematics
- Workplaces: Technische Universität Ilmenau
- Academic advisors: Herbert Grötzsch
- Notable students: Hansjoachim Walther; Michael Stiebitz

Horst Sachs (27 March 1927 – 25 April 2016) was a German mathematician, an expert in graph theory, a recipient of the Euler Medal (2000).

He earned the degree of Doctor of Science (Dr. rer. nat.) from the Martin-Luther-Universität Halle-Wittenberg in 1958. Following his retirement in 1992, he was professor emeritus at the Institute of Mathematics of the Technische Universität Ilmenau.

His encyclopedic book in spectral graph theory, Spectra of Graphs. Theory and Applications (with Dragos Cvetković and Michael Doob) has several editions and was translated in several languages.

Two theorems in graph theory bear his name. One of them relates the coefficients of the characteristic polynomial of a graph to certain structural features of the graph. Another one is a simple relation between the characteristic polynomials of a graph and its line graph. Sachs subgraphs are also named after Sachs.
