= Redło, Goleniów County =

Redło
- Village
- Location within Poland
- Coordinates: 53°35′1″N 15°4′51″E
- Country: Poland
- Voivodeship: West Pomeranian
- County: Goleniów
- Gmina: Osina

Redło [ˈrɛdwɔ] (German: Pflugrade) is a village in the administrative district of Gmina Osina, within Goleniów County, West Pomeranian Voivodeship, in north-western Poland. It lies approximately 6 km (4 mi) south-east of Osina, 18 km (11 mi) east of Goleniów, and 38 km (24 mi) north-east of the regional capital Szczecin.

For the history of the region, see History of Pomerania.

== Notable people ==
The German geneticist and eugenicist Fritz Lenz (1887–1976), was born in Redło, Goleniów County (then Pflugrade)
