= International Conference on Systems Engineering =

The International Conference on Systems Engineering (ICSEng) is the series of International Conferences, jointly organized on a rotational basis among three institutions:

- University of Nevada, Las Vegas, United States – International Conference on Systems Engineering (ICSEng)
- Military University of Technology, Warsaw, Poland – International Conference on Systems Engineering (ICSEng)
- Toyo University, Tokyo, Japan – International Conference on Systems Engineering (ICSEng)
- past: NASK Naukowa i Akademicka Sieć Komputerowa, Warsaw – International Conference on Systems Engineering (ICSEng)
- past: Wrocław University of Science and Technology, Poland – International Conference on Systems Science (ICSS)
- past: Coventry University – International Conference on Systems Engineering (ICSE)

The conference covers Systems Engineering with a focus on applications. It was first held in 1974 in Wrocław (Poland) as 1st ICSS. In its current form, it was founded by Zdzisław Bubnicki, William Wells and Glyn James. The 33rd edition of ICSEng will be held in 2026 in Las Vegas, USA.

== History ==
In 1973, a group of young scientists from Wroclaw University of Technology (now Wroclaw University of Science and Technology) led by Professor Zdzislaw Bubnicki invited scientists from around the world in order to exchange ideas of modern problems of systems science and engineering. The first International Conference "Systems Science" was held in the European city of Wroclaw, Poland (with some sessions organized in the nearby town of Szklarska Poręba). The event was a big success and the organizers decided to continue with the conference annually. The first six editions of Systems Science (until 1979) were organized by Wroclaw University of Technology – attracting scientists from the USA, Japan, India and almost all European countries. After six years of existence, the conference was already well known as a forum for presentation of original papers on a good professional level and for discussions integrating different subjects of systems science and engineering and specialists from universities, research centres, and industry.

During the conference in 1979, Professor Zdzislaw Bubnicki decided to organize future conferences in Wroclaw every two years, and Professor Glyn James and his colleagues from the Coventry University in England suggested that they join a team from Wroclaw to organize the conferences in alternate years in Coventry. Consequently, the next edition in 1980, took place in Coventry. In 1983, Professor William Wells from the University of Nevada Las Vegas, USA and his colleagues joined the teams from Poland and England, and the next meeting in 1984 was organized in Las Vegas, USA. Then it was decided, that to call conferences in Poland as "Systems Science" and in England and USA as "Systems Engineering".

Conference proceedings are published in Springer Publishing or IEEE Xplore, and are indexed by ISI Web of Science, DBLP, SCOPUS and Google Scholar.

== Topics ==
It is expected that ICSEng includes sessions on the following themes:

- Machine Learning / AI
- BigData (Data Mining, Data Warehouses, Sensor Networks, Data Classification, Regression)
- Intelligent Systems (Expert Systems, Artificial Intelligence, Neural Network, Fuzzy, Optimization Techniques, Hybrid Systems, Applications)
- Internet of Things (Consumer IoT, Smart Cities, Agriculture, Industrial IoT)
- Cybersecurity in Networks, IoT, Physical Systems and other areas
- Distributed Computer and Computer Networks Systems (Distributed and Wireless Systems, Distributed Servers, Parallel and Distributed Systems, Networks)
- Cloud Computing (CC Cybersecurity, Design, Applications)
- Information and Communication Systems (Information and Communication Theory, Geographic Information Systems, Global Position Systems, Applications)
- Analog and Digital Hardware Systems (Real-time Systems / RTOS, Embedded Systems, Hybrid Embedded Systems, Mixed Signal Designs)
- Industrial Automation and Robotics (including IIoT)
- BioEngineering (sensors, integration, data analysis, verification techniques)
- BioSurveillance Systems (heterogeneous data sources, monitoring techniques, signal detection algorithms, privacy protection )
- Control Systems (Control Theory, System Identification and Adaptive Control, Nonlinear Controls, Applications)
- Uncertain Systems
- Aero-Space Systems (Avionics, Unmanned Aerial Vehicles, Aviation Control)
- Systems Engineering Standards, Modeling, Paradigms, Metrics, Testing, Management, Optimization, Simulation, Scheduling, Reliability and Fault Tolerant
- Systems Engineering Education
- Computer Assisted Medical Diagnostic Systems (single and multiple modality medical data analysis, expert systems, prompting systems, databases, performance evaluation)
- Power Systems (Renewable Energy, Environmental Systems, Smart Grids, Renewable Energy, Nuclear Energy)
- Gaming and Entertainment Systems (Algorithms (including randomization), Security, Design)
- Environmental Systems
- Covid19 related solutions

== Affiliated events ==
- ICSEng, Toyo University, Japan (website)
- ICSEng, Military University of Technology (MUT), Warsaw, Poland (website)
- ICSEng, NASK, Poland (website)
- ICSS, Wrocław University of Technology, Poland (website)
- ICSE, Coventry University, United Kingdom, (website)

== Related journals ==
- International Journal of Electronics and Telecommunications (http://www.degruyter.com/view/j/eletel)
- Journal of Systems Science
- Lecture Notes in Networks and Systems Book (https://www.springer.com/series/15179)

== List of conferences ==
- 2026: 33rd ICSEng, Las Vegas, NV, USA
- 2025: 32nd ICSEng, Warsaw, Poland
- 2024: 31st ICSEng, Warsaw, Poland
- 2023: 30th ICSEng, Las Vegas, NV, USA
- 2022: 29th ICSEng, Tokyo, Japan
- 2021: 28th ICSEng, Wrocław, Poland
- 2020: 27th ICSEng, Las Vegas, NV, USA (online)
- 2018: 26th ICSEng, Sydney, NSW, Australia
- 2017: 25th ICSEng, Las Vegas, Nevada,
- 2016: 19th ICSS, Wrocław, Poland
- 2015: 24th ICSE, Coventry, UK
- 2014: 23rd ICSEng, Las Vegas, Nevada, USA,
- 2013: 18th ICSS, Wrocław, Poland
- 2012: 22nd ICSE, Coventry, UK
- 2011: 21st ICSEng, Las Vegas, Nevada, USA
- 2010: 17th ICSS, Wrocław, Poland
- 2009: 20th ICSE, Coventry, UK
- 2008: 19th ICSEng, Las Vegas, Nevada, USA
- 2007: 16th ICSS, Wrocław, Poland
- 2006: 18th ICSE, Coventry, UK
- 2005: 17th ICSEng, Las Vegas, Nevada, USA
- 2004: 15th ICSS, Wrocław, Poland
- 2003: 16th ICSE, Coventry, UK
- 2002: 15th ICSEng, Las Vegas, Nevada, USA
- 2001: 14th ICSS, Wrocław, Poland
- 2000: 14th ICSE, Coventry, UK
- 1999: 13th ICSEng, Las Vegas, Nevada, USA
- 1998: 13th ICSS, Wrocław, Poland
- 1997: 12th ICSE, Coventry, UK
- 1996: 11th ICSEng, Las Vegas, Nevada, USA
- 1995: 12th ICSS, Wrocław, Poland
- 1994: 10th ICSE, Coventry, UK
- 1993: 9th ICSEng, Las Vegas, Nevada, USA
- 1992: 11th ICSS, Wrocław, Poland
- 1991: 8th ICSE, Coventry, UK
- 1990: 7th ICSEng, Las Vegas, Nevada, USA
- 1989: 10th ICSS, Wrocław, Poland
- 1988: 6th ICSE, Coventry, UK
- 1987: 5th ICSEng, Fairborn, Ohio, USA
- 1986: 9th ICSS, Wrocław, Poland
- 1985: 4th ICSE, Coventry, UK
- 1984: 3rd ICSEng, Dayton, Ohio, USA
- 1983: 8th ICSS, Wrocław, Poland
- 1982: 2nd ICSE, Coventry, England
- 1981: 7th ICSS, Wrocław, Poland
- 1980: 1st ICSE, Coventry, UK
- 1979: 6th ICSS, Wrocław, Poland
- 1978: 5th ICSS, Wrocław, Poland
- 1977: 4th ICSS, Wrocław, Poland
- 1976: 3rd ICSS, Wrocław, Poland
- 1975: 2nd ICSS, Wrocław, Poland
- 1974: 1st ICSS, Wrocław / Szklarska Poręba, Poland
