= Doug Stinson =

Canadian mathematician and cryptographer (born 1956)

Douglas Robert Stinson
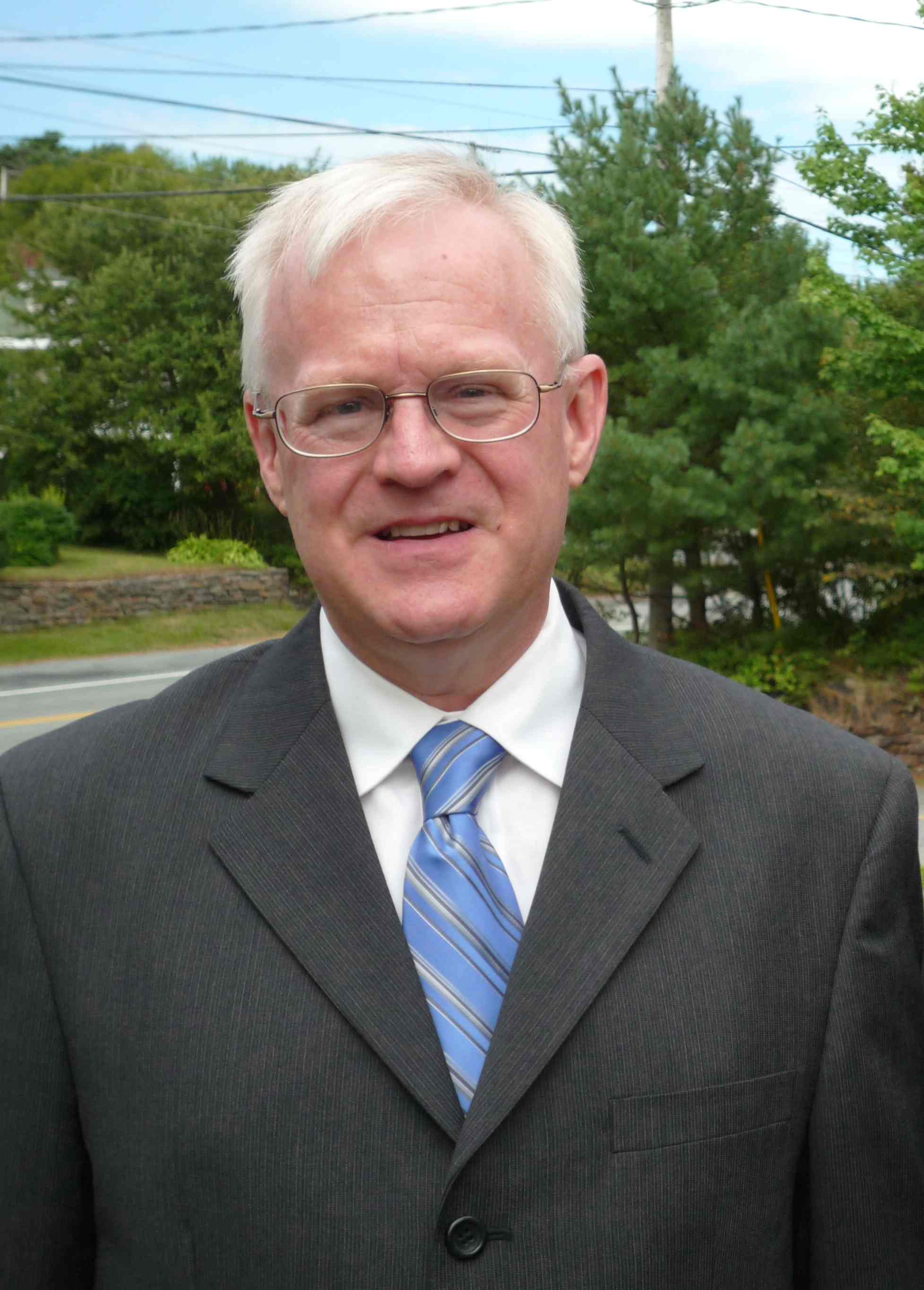
- Born: 1956; Guelph, Ontario, Canada
- Education: University of Waterloo, Ohio State University
- Scientific career
- Workplaces: University of Manitoba, University of Nebraska–Lincoln, University of Waterloo
- Notable students: Atefeh Mashatan

Douglas Robert Stinson (born 1956 in Guelph, Ontario) is a Canadian mathematician and cryptographer, currently a Professor Emeritus at the University of Waterloo.

Stinson received his B.Math from the University of Waterloo in 1978, his M.Sc. from Ohio State University in 1980, and his Ph.D. from the University of Waterloo in 1981. He was at the University of Manitoba from 1981 to 1989, and the University of Nebraska–Lincoln from 1990 to 1998. In 2011 he was named as a Fellow of the Royal Society of Canada.

Stinson is the author of over 300 research publications as well as the mathematics-based cryptography textbook Cryptography: Theory and Practice (ISBN 9781584885085).

== Selected publications ==
- Stinson, Doug R. (Nov 1997). "On Some Methods for Unconditionally Secure Key Distribution and Broadcast Encryption". Designs, Codes and Cryptography. 12 (3): 215–243. doi:10.1023/A:1008268610932. S2CID 14778421.

== See also ==
- List of University of Waterloo people
