= Dieter Jungnickel =

German mathematician, specialist in combinatorics

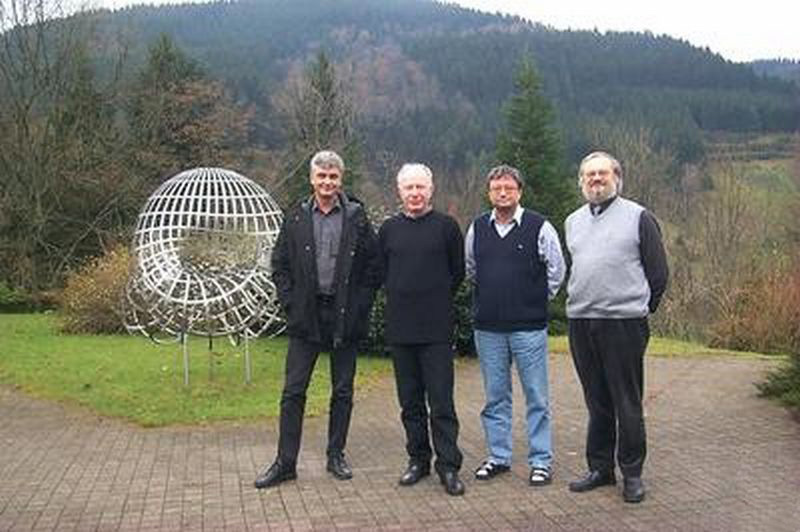
From left: Aart Blokhuis, James William Peter Hirschfeld, Dieter Jungnickel, and Joseph A. Thas, at the MFO, 2001

Dieter Jungnickel (born 20 March 1952 in Berlin) is a German mathematician specializing in combinatorics.

In 1971 Jungnickel entered the Free University of Berlin, graduating in 1975. He studied the finite difference method with Hanfried Lenz and completed his Habilitation in 1978. He became a professor of mathematics at University of Giessen in 1980.

The uses of finite geometry in coding theory led Jungnickel and Thomas Beth to write "Variations of Seven Points" which used the Fano plane as a starting point.

With Thomas Beth and Hanfried Lenz he wrote Design Theory (1985) on combinatorial design. Albrecht Beutelspacher reviewed it positively as deserving high estimation, and as an impressive work. It was re-published by Cambridge University Press in 1986. He updated the work in 1989 For the second edition Design Theory (1999) was split into two volumes, one and two.

In 1990 Jungnickel wrote an article on geometric and graph-theoretical aspects of latin squares of interest in coding theory. In September 1990 University of Vermont was the site of a conference concerned with the mathematics of coding theory, and commemorating the contributions of Marshall Hall. Together with Scott Vanstone, Jungnickel edited the Proceedings.

In 1993 Jungnickel joined the University of Augsburg where he occupies the chair for discrete mathematics, optimisation, and operations research.

Jungnickel wrote about finite fields in 1993: Finite fields, Structure and Arithmetics. A reviewer notes that "The author does a beautiful job showing and developing the practical applicability of the fascinating area of finite field theory".

In 1999 his book Graphs, Networks and Algorithms appeared as translation of the 1994 German version. A reviewer calls it a "first class textbook" and indispensable for teachers of combinatorial optimization. The second edition appeared in 2005, the third in 2008, and the fourth in 2013.
