= James William Peter Hirschfeld =

Australian mathematician

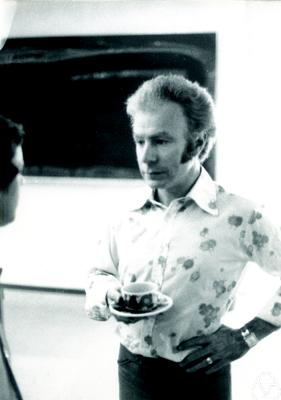
Hirschfeld at the MFO

James William Peter Hirschfeld (born 1940) is an Australian mathematician, resident in the United Kingdom, specializing in combinatorial geometry and the geometry of finite fields. He is an emeritus professor and Tutorial Fellow at the University of Sussex.

Hirschfeld received his doctorate in 1966 from the University of Edinburgh with thesis advisor William Leonard Edge and thesis The geometry of cubic surfaces, and Grace's extension of the double-six, over finite fields.

To pursue further studies in finite geometry Hirschfeld went to University of Perugia and University of Rome with support from the Royal Society and Accademia nazionale dei Lincei. He edited Beniamino Segre's 100-page monograph "Introduction to Galois Geometries" (1967).

In 1979 Hirschfeld published the first of a trilogy on Galois geometry, pegged at a level depending only on "the group theory and linear algebra taught in a first degree course, as well as a little projective geometry, and a very little algebraic geometry." When q is a prime power then there is a finite field GF(q) with q elements called a Galois field. A vector space over GF(q) of n + 1 dimensions produces an n-dimensional Galois geometry PG(n,q) with its subspaces: one-dimensional subspaces are the points of the Galois geometry and two-dimensional subspaces are the lines. Non-singular linear transformations of the vector space provide motions of PG(n,q). The first book (1979) covered PG(1,q) and PG(2,q). The second book addressed PG(3,q) and the third PG(n,q). Chapters are numbered sequentially through the trilogy: 14 in the first book, 15 to 21 in the second, and 22 to 27 in the third. Finite geometry has contributed to coding theory, such as algebraic geometry codes, so the field is supported by computer science. In the preface of the 1991 text Hirschfeld summarizes the status of Galois geometry, mentioning maximum distance separable code, mathematics journals publishing finite geometry, and conferences on combinatorics featuring Galois geometry. Colleague Joseph A. Thas is coauthor of General Galois Geometries on PG(n,q) where n ≥ 4.

Hirschfeld was cited as the ultimate editor of Design Theory (1986).

In 2018 he received the 2016 Euler Medal.

== Selected publications ==
- 1979: Projective Geometries over Finite Fields, Oxford University Press 2nd ed., Oxford, Clarendon Press 1998
- 1985: Finite Projective Spaces of Three Dimensions, Oxford University Press
- 1991: (with Joseph A. Thas) General Galois Geometries, Oxford University Press 2016 paperback reprint
- 2008: (with Gábor Korchmáros & Fernando Torres) Algebraic Curves over a Finite Field, Princeton University Press
