= Technische Universität Ilmenau =

German public research university

Ilmenau University of Technology
- Technische Universität Ilmenau
- Motto: The Spirit of Science
- Type: Public
- Established: 1894
- Budget: EUR 124.2 million
- Academic staff: 778
- Students: 3,968
- Location: Ilmenau, Thuringia, Germany; 50°40′54″N 10°56′20″E
- Athletics: Gymnastics, Varsity Football, Men's and Women's Basketball, Swimming, Diving, Field Hockey, Soccer, Track and Field
- Colors: Green and White
- Website: www.tu-ilmenau.de
- Location within Germany Location within Thuringia

The Technische Universität Ilmenau (Ilmenau University of Technology, TU Ilmenau) is a German public research university located in Ilmenau, Thuringia, central Germany. Founded in 1894, it has five academic departments (faculties) with about 4,000 students. Teaching and research are focused on engineering and technology (including computer science), mathematics, natural sciences, business, and media.

== Introduction ==
=== Background ===
Research and education at the Technische Universität Ilmenau is focused on engineering with strong links to economics and natural sciences. It is the only university in the federal state of Thüringen with the title "Technische Universität". The university began its life in 1894 as the "Thüringisches Technikum", a private training college. This took on the status of "Hochschule für Elektrotechnik" (HfE) before becoming a "Technische Hochschule" (TH) and in 1992 being accorded the title of "Technische Universität" (TU).

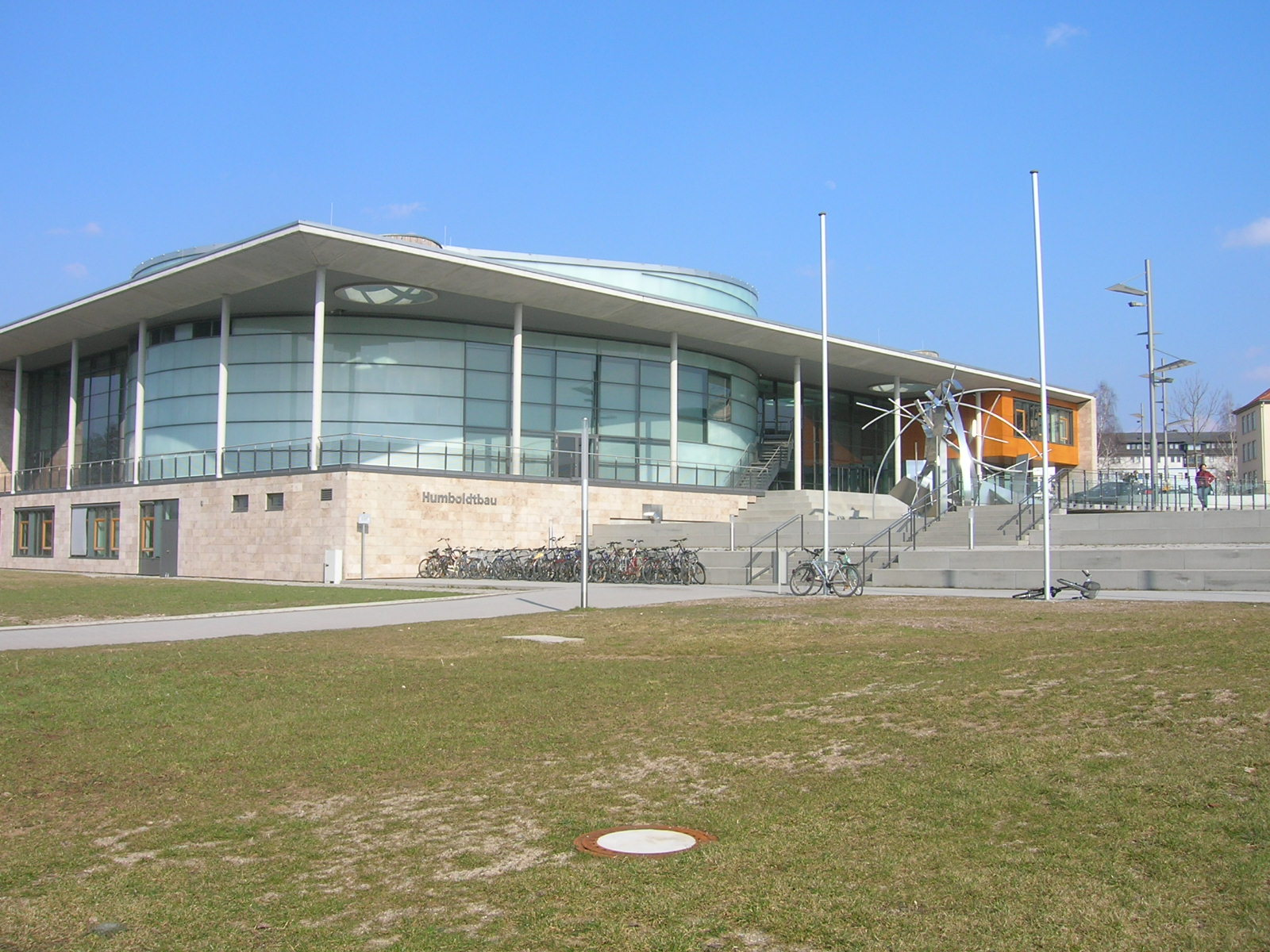
The Humboldt building at the Technische Universität Ilmenau.

=== Academics ===
TU Ilmenau offers degrees in technology, science, economics and media. These all also form part of the interdisciplinary media subjects which are a more recent development and combine technology, economics, law and social studies.

The 4,900 students (2021/22) include about 1,700 who come from around 100 nations outside Germany. The courses they take lead to bachelor's and/or master's degrees in which the subjects tend to be drawn from a number of disciplines within the overall groups of engineering, mathematics with science, and economics with social studies.

Among the distinguishing features of the TU Ilmenau are personal care for students from professors, tutors and student mentors; a campus with modern buildings only short distances apart; a variety of social activities and social support; many student associations as well as diverse cultural and sports activities.

The Fraunhofer Institute of Digital Media Technology (IDMT) is located near the TU Ilmenau campus. It is well known for their audio processing technology, media compression, and video processing teams.

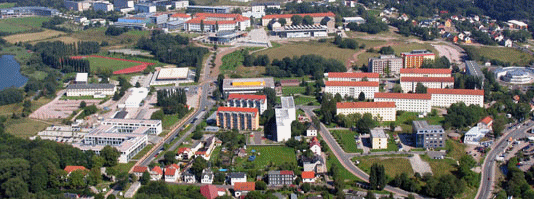
University

== Departments ==
- Department of Electrical Engineering and Information Technology
- Department of Computer Science and Automation
- Department of Mechanical Engineering
- Department of Mathematics and Natural Science
- Department of Economic Sciences and Media

=== Department of Electrical Engineering and Information Technology ===
The Department of Electrical Engineering and Information Technology has its roots in the Faculties of Heavy Current Technology and Light Current Technology of the erstwhile engineering college, the "Hochschule für Elektrotechnik" (HfE). It comprises four institutes as well as the Inter-Faculty Institute for Materials Technology and is in charge of the following graduate courses of study: Electrical Engineering and Information Technology, Media Technology, Communications and Signal Processing, as well as the further education course of Telecommunications Manager. The inventor of the MP3 music encoding format Karlheinz Brandenburg is one of the professors at this Faculty.

=== Department of Computer Science and Automation ===
The Department of Computer Science and Automation has its roots in the Institutes of Control Engineering and Electromedical and Radiological of the HfE as well as in the scientific fields of Engineering Informatics and Computer Engineering of the former TH Ilmenau. This faculty has five institutes including 20 departments and the junior professorship "Automation Technology" and is in charge of the course of study of "Biomedical Engineering", "Computer Science", "Computer Engineering" and "Technical Cybernetics and Systems Theory".

=== Department of Mechanical Engineering ===
The Department of Mechanical Engineering was founded as Faculty of Precision Mechanics and Optics at the HfE. It comprises 19 departments as well as the junior professorship "Design of mechatronics drives" and is in charge of the graduate courses of study of Mechanical Engineering, Mechatronics, Automotive Engineering, Optronics, Teacher Training for Vocational School and Materials Science taught at the Inter-Faculty Institute for Materials Technology. Complementary further-education courses offered include Applications of Light and Innovative Engineering Design for Industrial Machinery and Equipment (shared course with the Friedrich-Schiller-Universität Jena).

=== Department of Mathematics and Natural Science ===
The Department of Mathematics and Natural Science has emerged from the Faculty of Mathematics, Natural Science and Technical Basic Sciences of the HfE. At present, it comprises the Institutes of Mathematics, Physics, Chemistry and Biotechnique as well as Media and Communications. It is in charge of the graduate courses of study of Mathematics, Technical Physics and Applied Media Science. Furthermore, it is responsible for the basic training of the students required for other courses of study in mathematics, physics and chemistry.

=== Department of Economic Sciences and Media ===
The Department of Economic Sciences and Media opened in 1990/91 is the youngest of all faculties at the university. The course of study of Business Informatics has been offered since 1988, and in 1990, the course of study of Industrial Engineering and Management was added. This faculty has four institutes including 15 departments and is in charge of the graduate courses of study of Commercial Information Technology, Industrial Engineering and Management and Media Economics. In the field of further education, it is responsible for the postgraduate course of Economic and Technical Information.

== Research ==
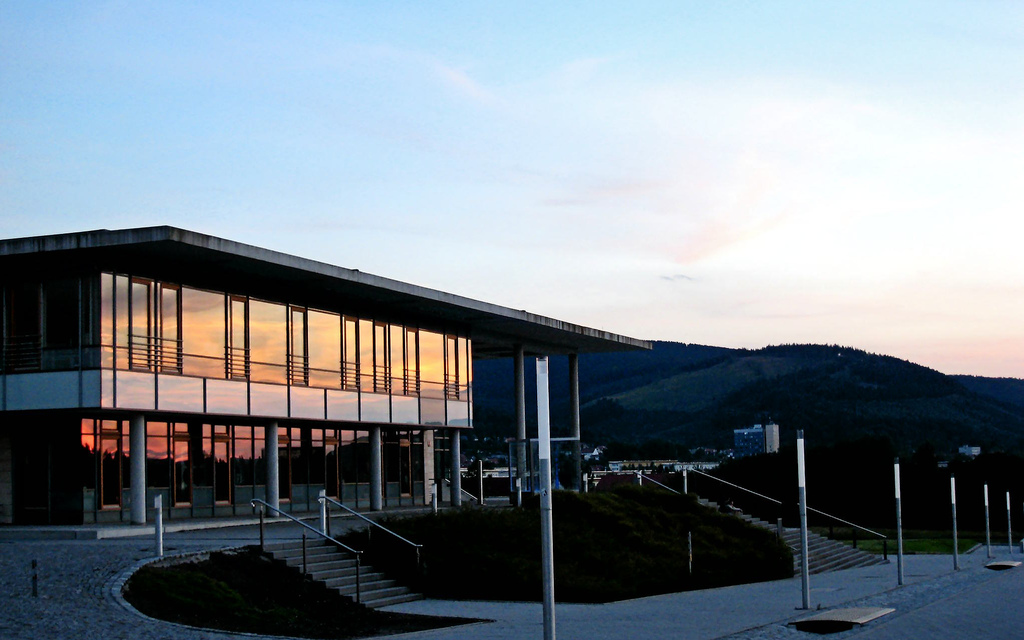
The Newtonbau building at the Technische Universität Ilmenau.

Research in Ilmenau is carried out at all stages: theory, application of the theory, prototype testing and transfer to industrial application. Because the TU relies upon interdisciplinary work across faculty boundaries, and brings together many skills thereby, the following highly competitive research activities have been established:

- Mobile communications
- Nano-engineering
- Precision engineering, instrumentation and measurement
- Technical and biomedical prosthetic systems
- Drive technology, energy and environmental engineering
- Digital media technology

The university has a major centre contributing greatly to its research performance, the ZMN, Centre for Micro- and Nanotechnology. So that results achieved in applied research can be transferred rapidly to industrial use, and so that spin-off companies are founded by the university and new partners found for collaborative projects, the university has set up public-private partnerships on new models, with the university taking a seat on the management boards of industrial companies. This concept is underlain by the entities known as "TU Ilmenau Service GmbH" and the "Technologiegesellschaft Thüringen mbH & Co. KG".

The university is actively participating in the restructuring and development of the region ("Technologieregion Ilmenau-Arnstadt"). It also contributes to regional planning with its thinking on the encouragement of a high-tech periphery to the campus itself. There is a large number of innovative technological companies which have taken root in the immediate area of the university. With the "Energietechnisches Zentrum Thüringen" (Energy Engineering Centre for Thuringia), the TU Ilmenau is also steering its research strategy into energy engineering. Here the intention is to unite the academic strength of the university in energy engineering and management with the interest of other Thuringian enterprises and institutes.

== Rankings ==
University rankings

Overall – Global & National
THE World 2024	1001–1200	49

In the Times Higher Education World University Rankings of 2024, the university is placed at 1001–1200 globally and 49th within the country.

== National and international networking ==
The Technische Universität Ilmenau is an active partner in the scientific-technological and economic promotion of the Ilmenau Technological Development Area. In addition to this, it seeks to gain a wider reputation on both a national and international scale. Considering educational export as one its main tasks, the university supports the international exchange of its students and collaborators on the basis of programmes set up for this purpose.
The Technische Universität Ilmenau strives to increase the number of foreign students and therefore promotes the cultural education as an important aspect of an ever increasing international competence requested.
Every two years the Initiative Solidarische Welt Ilmenau e.V. hosts ISWI (International Student Week Ilmenau) at the TU Ilmenau. It is an international conference for students from all around the world. It aims to foster tolerance, understanding among nations and an international attitude. The TU Ilmenau runs we4you, which is an organization to help and welcome international students in Ilmenau.

== TU Ilmenau in Thuringian scientific and technological culture ==
The university is the most important employer in Ilmenau. It is one of the four universities in Thuringia, the others being the University of Erfurt, the Bauhaus University of Weimar, and the Friedrich Schiller University of Jena. It is now the most important centre of science in Thuringia, and intensive cooperations with the TU Ilmenau occur.

== People ==
=== Faculty ===
- Kai-Uwe Sattler – President
- Karlheinz Brandenburg – Electrical Engineer and Mathematician
- Michael Roth (1936–2019) – Engineer
- Horst Sachs (1927–2016) – Mathematician
- Hansjoachim Walther (1939–2005) – Mathematician

== See also ==
- Conference of European Schools for Advanced Engineering Education and Research
