= Algorithms and Combinatorics =

Algorithms and Combinatorics (ISSN 0937-5511) is a book series in mathematics, and particularly in combinatorics and the design and analysis of algorithms. It is published by Springer Science+Business Media, and was founded in 1987.

== Books ==
The books published in this series include:

- The Simplex Method: A Probabilistic Analysis (Karl Heinz Borgwardt, 1987, vol. 1)
- Geometric Algorithms and Combinatorial Optimization (Martin Grötschel, László Lovász, and Alexander Schrijver, 1988, vol. 2; 2nd ed., 1993)
- Systems Analysis by Graphs and Matroids (Kazuo Murota, 1987, vol. 3)
- Greedoids (Bernhard Korte, László Lovász, and Rainer Schrader, 1991, vol. 4)
- Mathematics of Ramsey Theory (Jaroslav Nešetřil and Vojtěch Rödl, eds., 1990, vol. 5)
- Matroid Theory and its Applications in Electric Network Theory and in Statics (Andras Recszki, 1989, vol. 6)
- Irregularities of Partitions: Papers from the meeting held in Fertőd, July 7–11, 1986 (Gábor Halász and Vera T. Sós, eds., 1989, vol. 8)
- Paths, Flows, and VLSI-Layout: Papers from the meeting held at the University of Bonn, Bonn, June 20–July 1, 1988 (Bernhard Korte, László Lovász, Hans Jürgen Prömel, and Alexander Schrijver, eds., 1990, vol. 9)
- New Trends in Discrete and Computational Geometry (János Pach, ed., 1993, vol. 10)
- Discrete Images, Objects, and Functions in $\mathbb{Z}^n$ (Klaus Voss, 1993, vol. 11)
- Linear Optimization and Extensions (Manfred Padberg, 1999, vol. 12)
- The Mathematics of Paul Erdős I (Ronald Graham and Jaroslav Nešetřil, eds., 1997, vol. 13)
- The Mathematics of Paul Erdős II (Ronald Graham and Jaroslav Nešetřil, eds., 1997, vol. 14)
- Geometry of Cuts and Metrics (Michel Deza and Monique Laurent, 1997, vol. 15)
- Probabilistic Methods for Algorithmic Discrete Mathematics (M. Habib, C. McDiarmid, J. Ramirez-Alfonsin, and B. Reed, 1998, vol. 16)
- Modern Cryptography, Probabilistic Proofs and Pseudorandomness (Oded Goldreich, 1999, vol. 17)
- Geometric Discrepancy: An Illustrated Guide (Jiří Matoušek, 1999, vol. 18)
- Applied Finite Group Actions (Adalbert Kerber, 1999, vol. 19)
- Matrices and Matroids for Systems Analysis (Kazuo Murota, 2000, vol. 20; corrected ed., 2010)
- Combinatorial Optimization (Bernhard Korte and Jens Vygen, 2000, vol. 21; 5th ed., 2012)
- The Strange Logic of Random Graphs (Joel Spencer, 2001, vol. 22)
- Graph Colouring and the Probabilistic Method (Michael Molloy and Bruce Reed, 2002, Vol. 23)
- Combinatorial Optimization: Polyhedra and Efficiency (Alexander Schrijver, 2003, vol. 24. In three volumes: A. Paths, flows, matchings; B. Matroids, trees, stable sets; C. Disjoint paths, hypergraphs)
- Discrete and Computational Geometry: The Goodman-Pollack Festschrift (B. Aronov, S. Basu, J. Pach, and M. Sharir, eds., 2003, vol. 25)
- Topics in Discrete Mathematics: Dedicated to Jarik Nešetril on the Occasion of his 60th birthday (M. Klazar, J. Kratochvíl, M. Loebl, J. Matoušek, R. Thomas, and P. Valtr, eds., 2006, vol. 26)
- Boolean Function Complexity: Advances and Frontiers (Stasys Jukna, 2012, Vol. 27)
- Sparsity: Graphs, Structures, and Algorithms (Jaroslav Nešetřil and Patrice Ossona de Mendez, 2012, vol. 28)
- Optimal Interconnection Trees in the Plane (Marcus Brazil and Martin Zachariasen, 2015, vol. 29)
- Combinatorics and Complexity of Partition Functions (Alexander Barvinok, 2016, vol. 30)
