= Visual thinking =

Thinking through visual processing

Visual thinking, also called visual or spatial learning or picture thinking, is the phenomenon of thinking through visual processing. Visual thinking has been described as seeing words as a series of pictures. It is common in approximately 60–65% of the general population. "Real picture thinkers", those who use visual thinking almost to the exclusion of other kinds of thinking, make up a smaller percentage of the population. Research by child development theorist Linda Kreger Silverman suggests that less than 30% of the population strongly uses visual/spatial thinking, another 45% uses both visual/spatial thinking and thinking in the form of words, and 25% thinks exclusively in words. According to Kreger Silverman, of the 30% of the general population who use visual/spatial thinking, only a small percentage would use this style over and above all other forms of thinking, and can be said to be true "picture thinkers".

== Non-verbal thought ==
Thinking in mental images is one of a number of other recognized forms of non-verbal thought processes, such as kinesthetic, musical, and mathematical thinking.

=== Learning styles ===
The acknowledgement and application of different cognitive and learning styles, including visual, kinesthetic, musical, mathematical, and verbal thinking styles, are a common part of many current teacher training courses. Those who think in pictures have generally claimed to be best at visual learning.

Empirical research shows that there is no evidence that identifying a student's "learning style" produces better outcomes. There is significant evidence that the widespread "meshing hypothesis", the assumption that a student will learn best if taught in a method deemed appropriate for the student's learning style, is not fully studied in proper detail. “Of those that did use an appropriate method” of research, “several found results that flatly contradict the popular meshing hypothesis”.

=== Linguistics ===
A common assumption is that people think in language, and that language and thought influence each other. Linguistics studies how language is used and acquired.

The strong version of the Sapir–Whorf hypothesis in linguistics states that language determines thought, and that linguistic categories alone limit and determine cognitive categories. Although Whorf himself framed linguistic relativity in terms of "habits of mind" rather than determinism, the revolutionary nature of his hypothesis was met with much misinterpretation and criticism. In 1969, Brent Berlin and Paul Kay rejected the strong hypothesis using a color terminology study.

Steven Pinker notes that people are not born with language, so that it is not likely that they are engineered to think in words alone.

=== Multiple intelligences ===
Gardner's multiple intelligences theory recognises various forms of intelligence, namely spatial, linguistic, logical-mathematical, bodily-kinesthetic, musical, interpersonal, intrapersonal, naturalistic. Gardner's theory is discussed and cited in many of David A Sousa's 'How the Brain learns' series of books, including 'How the Gifted Brain learns' and 'How the Special Needs Brain Learns'. Areas of competence may be reinforcing, but also mutually exclusive. In today's society the link between IQ and education has weakened, but the idea of educated and intelligent has become synonymous, interchangeable and reinforced by verbalizers being better able to internalize information, advocate systems and design jobs that monetarily reward strengths, a cycle that is self-perpetuating.

=== Split-brain research ===
According to Roger Sperry the left hemisphere and the right hemisphere perform different tasks. The left and right hemisphere may be simultaneously conscious in different, even mutually conflicting, mental experiences that run in parallel. The right [non-verbal] hemisphere perceives, thinks, remembers, reasons, wills and emotes, all at a characteristically human level.

Research which builds on Sperry's split brain research is reinforced by anecdotal evidence, which supports the premise that different architectures lend themselves to one of the channels, at the expense of the others.

=== Spatial-temporal reasoning and spatial visualization ability ===
Spatial-temporal reasoning is the ability to visualize special patterns and mentally manipulate them over a time-ordered sequence of spatial transformations. Spatial visualization ability is the ability to manipulate mentally two- and three-dimensional figures.

Spatial-temporal reasoning is prominent among visual thinkers as well as among kinesthetic learners (those who learn through movement, physical patterning and doing) and logical thinkers (mathematical thinkers who think in patterns and systems) who may not be strong visual thinkers at all.

=== Problem solving ===
Visual thinking is also referenced in problem-solving. Inspired by Albert Einstein's visualized thought experiments, "Image Streaming" uses active visualization to rapidly explore a problem and generate multiple solution options. The technique was developed and formalized in the 1980s by Win Wenger. It involves visualizing and describing vivid mental images in detail while speaking out loud about the image and its various components.

=== Photographic memory ===
Eidetic memory (photographic memory) may co-occur in visual thinkers as much as in any type of thinking style as it is a memory function associated with having vision rather than a thinking style. Eidetic memory can still occur in those with visual agnosia, who, unlike visual thinkers, may be limited in the use of visualization skills for mental reasoning.

Psychologist E.R Jaensch states that eidetic memory as part of visual thinking has to do with eidetic images fading between the line of the after image and the memory image. A fine relationship may exist between the after image and the memory image, which causes visual thinkers from not seeing the eidetic image but rather drawing upon perception and useful information. Individuals diagnosed with agnosia, may not be able to perform mental reasoning.

== Visual Thinking Strategies (VTS) in teaching ==
VTS allows teachers to teach reading with the use of complex visuals, rather than the print and individual text forms used in the past.

== Concurrency with dyslexia and autism ==
=== Dyslexia ===
Research suggests that dyslexia is a symptom of a predominant visual/spatial learning. Morgan used the term 'word blindness,' in 1896. Hinselwood expanded on 'word blindness' to describe the reversing of letters and similar phenomena in the 1900s. Orton suggested that individuals have difficulty associating the visual with the verbal form of words, in 1925. Further studies, using technologies (PET and MRI), and wider and varied user groups in various languages, support the earlier findings. Visual-spatial symptoms (dyslexia, developmental coordination disorder, Auditory processing disorder and the like) arise in non-visual and non-spatial environments and situations; hence, visual/spatial learning is aggravated by an education system based upon information presented in written text instead of presented via multimedia and hands-on experience.

=== Autism ===
Visual thinking has been argued by Temple Grandin to be an origin for delayed speech in people with autism. It has been suggested that visual thinking has some necessary connection with autism. Functional imaging studies on people with autism have supported the hypothesis that they have a cognitive style that favors the use of visuospatial coding strategies. However, the existence of people with both Aphantasia and autism brings this theory into question.

== Art and design education ==
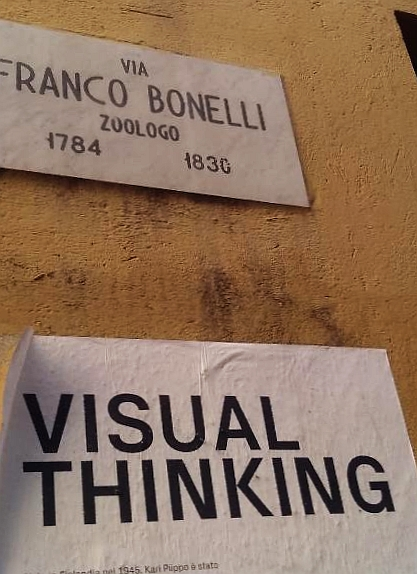
VISUAL THINKING: poster in Turin

Concepts related to visual thinking have played an important role in art and design education over the past several decades, but this has not always been the case. In Ancient Greece, Plato tended to place an emphasis on music to aid cognition in the education of heroes because of its mathematical tendencies and "harmonies of the cosmos". On the other hand, visual images, paintings in particular, caused the reliances on "illusionary images" However, in the Western world, children begin primary school with abstract thought and shapes, but as we grow older, according to Rudolf Arnheim, "arts are reduced to a desirable supplement" The general world trend in the late twentieth century caused an emphases towards scientific, mathematical, and quantitative approach to education, and art education is often refuted because it is based on perception. It is qualitative and subjective which makes it difficult to measure and evaluate.

However, fundamentals in visual thinking lay the ground work for many design disciplines such as art and architecture. Two of the most influential aspects of visual composition in these disciplines are patterns and color. Patterns are not only prevalent in many different aspects of everyday life, but it is also telling about our interpretation of the world. In addition, there are now studied approaches to how color should be used in design where "the functional aesthetics of colour can be reduced to a small number of guidelines and lists the main properties needed to make design decisions leading to visual clarity".

At the same time, techniques in art and design can open up pathways to stimulate the thought process and problem solving. Sketches offer an unrestrained way to get thoughts down on paper through the "abstract representations of ideas and idea structures". In this way, sketching not only helps to generate ideas, but also to reflect and edit them as well. It is also an effective means of communication, especially for architects and engineers, for translating ideas from designer to client. Despite all the advantages of integrating art and visuals into education, it is a difficult skill to master. Those who can are well versed in visual analysis. It takes a lot of practice to have sketches evolve from "meaningless scribbles" to a complex "thinking tool".

== See also ==
- Aphantasia
- Concept map
- Image schema
- Intellectual giftedness
- Mental image
- Mind map
- New Epoch Notation Painting
- Picture dictionary
- Rich pictures
- Rudolf Arnheim
- Visual language

== Sources ==
- Berlin, Brent; Kay, Paul (1969), Basic Color Terms: Their Universality and Evolution, University of California Press, ISBN 978-1-57586-162-3
- Michel Deza & Elena Deza (2009), Encyclopedia of Distances, Springer
- Felder, Richard M. (2007), Are Learning Styles Valid? (Hint: No!) (PDF)
- Pashler, H.; McDaniel, M.; Rohrer, D.; Bjork, R. (2008). "Learning styles: Concepts and evidence". Psychological Science in the Public Interest. 9 (3): 105–119. doi:10.1111/j.1539-6053.2009.01038.x. PMID 26162104.
- Silverman, Linda Kreger (2005), Upside-Down Brilliance: The Visual-Spatial Learner (PDF), Maria J. Krabbe Foundation for Visual Thinking
