= Svatopluk Poljak =

Czech mathematician (1951–1995)

- Born: 9 October 1951; Prague, Czechoslovakia
- Died: 2 April 1995 (aged 43); Czech Republic
- Education: Charles University, Prague
- Scientific career
- Fields: Mathematics
- Workplaces: Czech Technical University in Prague; Charles University; University of Passau
- Doctoral advisors: Zdeněk Hedrlín; Jaroslav Nešetřil

Svatopluk Poljak (also known as Sváťa Poljak; 9 October 1951 – 2 April 1995) was a Czech mathematician known for his work in discrete mathematics and combinatorial optimization.

== Biography ==
Poljak was born in Prague, Czechoslovakia (now the Czech Republic). In 1980, he earned his PhD in mathematics from Charles University in Prague under the supervision of Zdeněk Hedrlín and Jaroslav Nešetřil. Upon completing his PhD, he took a position at the Czech Technical University in Prague in the Department of Operations Research, and in 1986, he returned to Charles University for a senior research position in the Department of Applied Mathematics. While at Charles University, he was invited for extended academic visits to Kyoto, New Brunswick, Paris, Bonn and Taipei. He was awarded a Humboldt Fellowship for his 18-month stay in Bonn. In 1994, he became a professor of mathematics at the University of Passau.

On 2 April 1995, Poljak died in a car accident travelling from his summer house in the village of Nové Hutě to Prague.

== Contributions ==
Poljak made many important contributions in diverse areas of discrete mathematics, including matroid theory, matching theory, the max-cut and stable set problems, spectral graph theory, convex and polyhedral relaxations, semidefinite programming, and other integer programming-related problems. His early work also included contributions to the theory of neural networks. Over the course of his career, Poljak authored over 90 scientific papers. His frequent coauthors include Daniel Turzík, Vojtěch Rödl, Martin Loebl, Monique Laurent, Franz Rendl, Jaroslav Nešetřil, Zsolt Tuza, and Aleš Pultr.

== Recognition ==
The book Handbook of Semidefinite Programming: Theory, Algorithms, and Applications, published in 2000, was dedicated to the memory of Svatopluk Poljak. In 2025, an annual lecture series, entitled the "Poljak Lecture", was established in honour of Poljak at the University of Passau.
