= Zdeněk Hedrlín =

Czech mathematician (1933–2018)

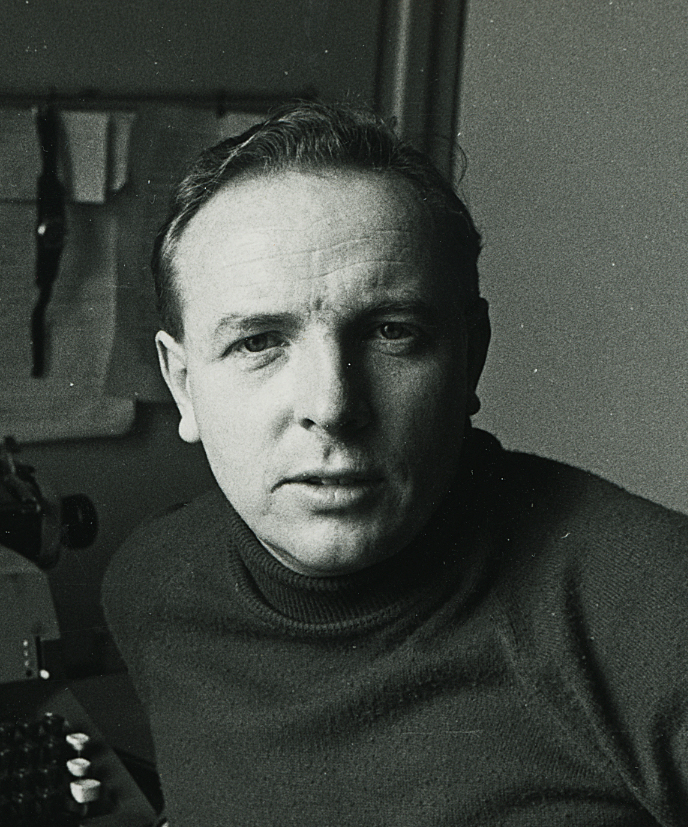
Image of Zdenek Hedrlin

Zdeněk Hedrlín (1933 – April 22, 2018) was a Czech mathematician, specializing in universal algebra and combinatorial theory, both in pure and applied mathematics.

Zdeněk Hedrlín received his PhD from Prague's Charles University in 1963. His thesis on commutative semigroups was supervised by Miroslav Katětov. Hedrlín held the title of Docent (associated professor) at Charles University, working at the Faculty of Mathematics and Physics for over 60 years until he died at age 85. He was among the first Czech mathematicians to do research on category theory.

Already in the mid-1960s, the Prague school of Zdeněk Hedrlín, Aleš Pultr and Věra Trnková had devised a particularly nice notion of concrete categories over Set, the so-called functor-structured categories ...

In 1970 Hedrlín was an Invited Speaker at the International Congress of Mathematicians in Nice. In the later part of his career, he focused on applications of relational structures and led very successful special and interdisciplinary seminars. Applications to biological cell behavior earned him and his students a European grant. (He and his students worked on computational cell models of cancer.)

Hedrlín was a member of the editorial board of the Journal of Pure and Applied Algebra. His Erdős number is 1. His doctoral students include Vojtěch Rödl and Svatopluk Poljak.

== Selected publication ==
- Hedrlín, Z. (1961). "On common fixed points of commutative mappings" (PDF). Commentationes Mathematicae Universitatis Carolinae. 2 (4): 25–28.
- Hedrlín, Zdeněk (1962). "On number of commutative mappings from finite set into itself (Preliminary communication)" (PDF). Commentationes Mathematicae Universitatis Carolinae. 3 (1): 32.
- Hedrlín, Z.; Pultr, A. (1963). "Remark on topological spaces with given semigroups" (PDF). Commentationes Mathematicae Universitatis Carolinae. 4 (4): 161–163.
- Hedrlín, Z.; Pultr, A. (1964). "Relations (graphs) with given finitely generated semigroups". Monatshefte für Mathematik. 68 (3): 213–217. doi:10.1007/BF01298508. S2CID 120856684.
- Pultr, A.; Hedrlín, Z. (1964). "Relations (graphs) with given infinite semigroups". Monatshefte für Mathematik. 68 (5): 421–425. doi:10.1007/BF01304185. S2CID 122610862.
- Baayen, P. C.; Hedrlin, Z. (1964). "On the existence of well distributed sequences in compact spaces" (PDF). Stichting Mathematisch Centrum. Zuivere Wiskunde.
- Hedrlín, Z.; Pultr, A. (1965). "Symmetric relations (undirected graphs) with given semigroups". Monatshefte für Mathematik. 69 (4): 318–322. doi:10.1007/BF01297617. S2CID 120384797.
- Vopěnka, P.; Pultr, A.; Hedrlín, Z. (1965). "A rigid relation exists on any set" (PDF). Commentationes Mathematicae Universitatis Carolinae. 6 (2): 149–155.
- Hedrlín, Zdeněk; Pultr, Aleš (1966). "On full embeddings of categories of algebras". Illinois Journal of Mathematics. 10 (3): 392–406. doi:10.1215/ijm/1256054991. (over 160 citations)
- Hedrlín, Z.; Pultr, A. (1966). "On Rigid Undirected Graphs". Canadian Journal of Mathematics. 18: 1237–1242. doi:10.4153/CJM-1966-121-7. S2CID 124453196.
- Hedrlín, Z.; Vopěnka, P. (1966). "An undecidable theorem concerning full embeddings into categories of algebras" (PDF). Commentationes Mathematicae Universitatis Carolinae. 7 (3): 401–409.
- Hedrlín, Z.; Pultr, A.; Trnková, V. (1967). "Concerning a categorial approach to topological and algebraic theories" (PDF). In: (ed.): General Topology and its Relations to Modern Analysis and Algebra, Proceedings of the second Prague topological symposium, 1966. Academia Publishing House of the Czechoslovak Academy of Sciences, Praha. pp. 176–181.
- Hedrlín, Zdeněk; Lambek, Joachim (1969). "How comprehensive is the category of semigroups?". Journal of Algebra. 11 (2): 195–212. doi:10.1016/0021-8693(69)90054-4.
- Hedrlín, Zdeněk (1969). "On universal partly ordered sets and classes" (PDF). Journal of Algebra. 11 (4): 503–509. doi:10.1016/0021-8693(69)90089-1.
- Hedrlín, Z.; Mendelsohn, E. (1969). "The Category of Graphs with a Given Subgraph-with Applications to Topology and Algebra". Canadian Journal of Mathematics. 21: 1506–1517. doi:10.4153/CJM-1969-165-5. S2CID 124324655.
- Goralčík, Pavel; Hedrlín, Zdeněk (1971). "On reconstruction of monoids from their table fragments". Mathematische Zeitschrift. 122: 82–92. doi:10.1007/BF01113568. S2CID 120230682.
- Chvatal, V.; Erdös, P.; Hedrlín, Z. (1972). "Ramsey's theorem and self-complementary graphs". Discrete Mathematics. 3 (4): 301–304. doi:10.1016/0012-365X(72)90087-8.
- Goralčík, P.; Hedrlín, Z.; Koubek, V.; Ryšunková, J. (1982). "A game of composing binary relations" (PDF). RAIRO Informatique Théorique. 16 (4): 365–369. doi:10.1051/ita/1982160403651.
- Hedrlín, Z.; Hell, P.; Ko, C.S. (1982). "Homomorphism Interpolation and Approximation". Algebraic and Geometric Combinatorics. North-Holland Mathematics Studies. Vol. 65. pp. 213–227. doi:10.1016/S0304-0208(08)73267-5. ISBN 9780444863652.
