= Pierre Rosenstiehl =

French mathematician (1933–2020)

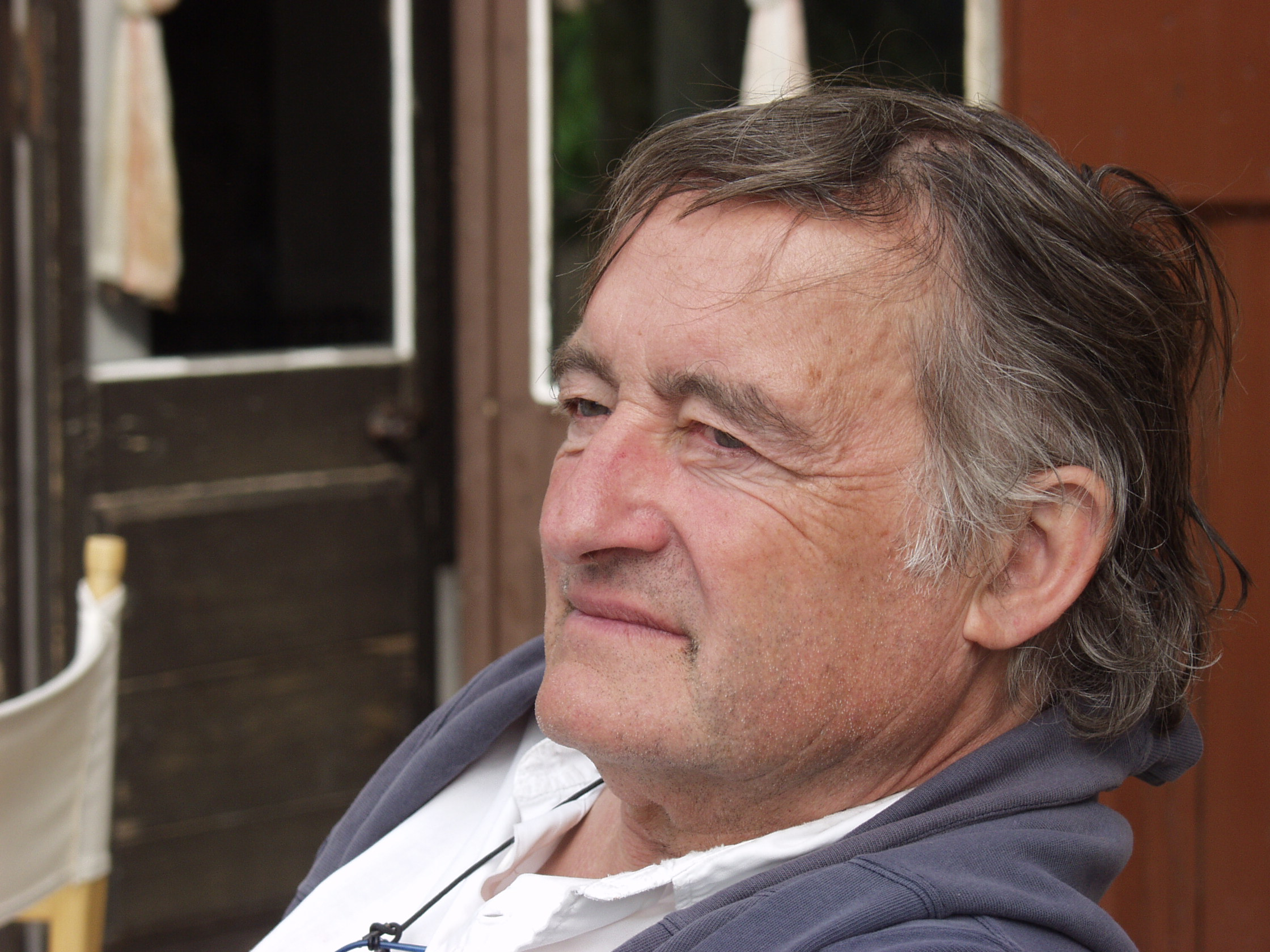
Pierre Rosenstiehl

Pierre Rosenstiehl (5 December 1933 – 28 October 2020) was a French mathematician recognized for his work in graph theory, planar graphs, and graph drawing.

The Fraysseix-Rosenstiehl's planarity criterion is at the origin of the left-right planarity algorithm implemented in Pigale software, which is considered the fastest implemented planarity testing algorithm.

Rosenstiehl was directeur d’études at the École des Hautes Études en Sciences Sociales in Paris, before his retirement. He was a founding co-editor in chief of the European Journal of Combinatorics. Rosenstiehl, Giuseppe Di Battista, Peter Eades and Roberto Tamassia organized in 1992 at Marino (Italy) a meeting devoted to graph drawing which initiated a long series of international conferences, the International Symposia on Graph Drawing.

He has been a member of the French literary group Oulipo since 1992. He married the French author and illustrator Agnès Rosenstiehl.
