= Patrice Ossona de Mendez =

French mathematician

- Patrice Ossona de Mendez
- Born: 13 December 1966 (age 59); Paris, France
- Education: EHESS, Paris
- Awards: bronze medal at International Mathematical Olympiad (1985), Nerode Prize (2025).
- Scientific career
- Fields: Mathematician
- Workplaces: Centre national de la recherche scientifique
- Doctoral advisor: Hubert de Fraysseix, Pierre Rosenstiehl

Patrice Ossona de Mendez is a French mathematician specializing in topological graph theory who works as a researcher at the Centre national de la recherche scientifique in Paris. He is editor-in-chief of the European Journal of Combinatorics, a position he has held since 2009.

== Education and career ==
Ossona de Mendez was born on 13 December 1966 in Paris. He represented France in the International Mathematical Olympiad in 1985, earning a bronze medal there. He studied at the École Normale Supérieure from 1986 until 1990, and completed his Ph.D. in 1994 from the School for Advanced Studies in the Social Sciences. His dissertation, jointly supervised by Rosenstiehl and Hubert de Fraysseix, concerned bipolar orientations of graphs.

He has worked at CNRS since 1995, and earned a habilitation in 2009 from the University of Bordeaux 1.

Together with Jaroslav Nešetřil, he received the 2025 Nerode Prize for his work on Sparsity for the papers Grad and classes with bounded expansion I. Decompositions, Grad and classes with bounded expansion II. Algorithmic aspects, First order properties on nowhere dense structures, and On nowhere dense graphs.

== Book ==
With Jaroslav Nešetřil, he is the author of the book Sparsity: Graphs, Structures, and Algorithms (Algorithms and Combinatorics 28, Springer, 2012), concerning the properties and applications of different types of sparse graph. This book was included in ACM Computing Reviews list of Notable Books and Articles of 2012.

== See also ==
- Left-right planarity test
- Schnyder's theorem
- Bounded expansion
