= Ernst Peschl =

Mathematician

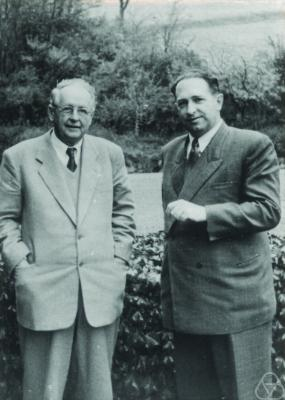
- Ernst Peschl (right), next to Hermann Weyl
- Born: Ernst Ferdinand Peschl; 1 September 1906; Passau, Bavaria, German Empire
- Died: 9 June 1986 (aged 79); Eitorf, West Germany
- Education: Ludwig-Maximilians-Universität München
- Spouse: Maria Stein (m. 1940–1976) (her death)
- Children: 1
- Awards: Pierre Fermat Medal (1965); Medal of the University of Jyväskylä (1965); Officier des Palmes Académiques (1975)
- Scientific career
- Fields: Geometric complex analysis, Partial differential equations, Multivariable complex analysis
- Workplaces: University of Münster; University of Jena; University of Bonn; Institute of Mathematics, Bonn
- Thesis: Über die Krümmung von Niveaukurven bei der konformen Abbildung einfachzusammenhängender Gebiete auf das Innere eines Kreises; eine Verallgemeinerung eines Satzes von E. Study ("On the curvature of level curves in the conformal mapping of simply connected domains to the interior of a circle: A generalization of a theorem of Eduard Study") (1931)
- Doctoral advisor: Constantin Carathéodory
- Doctoral students: Bernhard Korte
- Other notable students: Hans Hermes

Ernst Ferdinand Peschl (1 September 1906, Passau, Germany – 9 June 1986, Eitorf, Germany) was a German mathematician.

== Early life ==
Ernst Peschl came from a family of brewery owners. He was born to Eduard Ferdinand Peschl and his wife, Ulla (née Adler) in 1906.

== Education and academic appointments ==
After finishing secondary school in 1925 in Passau, Peschl started studying mathematics, physics, and astronomy at the Ludwig-Maximilians-Universität München. He received his doctorate in 1931 from the Ludwig-Maximilians-Universität München under the supervision of Constantin Carathéodory with a dissertation titled Über die Krümmung von Niveaukurven bei der konformen Abbildung einfachzusammenhängender Gebiete auf das Innere eines Kreises; eine Verallgemeinerung eines Satzes von E. Study ("On the curvature of level curves of the conformal mapping of simply connected domains to the interior of a circle: A generalization of a theorem of Eduard Study"). This was followed by some years spent working as an assistant with Robert König at the University of Jena and Heinrich Behnke at the University of Münster. He habilitated in 1935 at the University of Jena. Peschl took up a visiting professorship at the University of Bonn in 1938, and was subsequently promoted to extraordinary professor there.

Under pressure Peschl became a member of the Nazi Party and the paramilitary Sturmabteilung, but he avoided any activity within either organization and ended SA service after a year. From 1941 to 1943, he served as a French interpreter for the Wehrmacht. From 1943 to 1945, he worked at the German Aviation Research Institute in Brunswick, which exempted him from further military service during World War II.

After the war, Peschl became the director of the Institute of Mathematics in Bonn, and in 1948 he became a full professor there. He promoted applied mathematics and established the Institute for Instrumental Mathematics in Bonn which evolved into the Society for Mathematics and Data Processing. He led the Society with Heinz Unger from 1969 to 1974.

== Work ==
Ernst Peschl's main areas of research were geometric complex analysis, partial differential equations, and the theory of functions of several complex variables.

Peschl was the doctoral advisor of Claus Müller, Friedhelm Erwe, Karl Wilhelm Bauer, Bernhard Korte, Stephan Ruscheweyh, and Karl-Joachim Wirths, among others.

Peschl received an honorary doctorate from the University of Toulouse in 1969 and another honorary doctorate from the University of Graz in 1982. For his fruitful collaboration with French mathematicians, the French government awarded him an Officier des Palmes Académiques in 1975.

Peschl was a regular member of the North Rhine-Westphalian Academy of Sciences, the Bavarian and Austrian Academies of Sciences and a corresponding member of the Académie des Sciences, Inscriptions et Belles-Lettres in Toulouse. He was awarded the Pierre Fermat Medal and the Medal of the University of Jyväskylä, Finland, in 1965.

== Personal life ==
Peschl married Maria Stein, a physician, in 1940, and had one daughter, Gisela.

== Publications ==
- Über die Krümmung von Niveaukurven bei der konformen Abbildung einfachzusammenhängender Gebiete auf das Innere eines Kreises. Eine Verallgemeinerung eines Satzes von E. Study ("On the curvature of level curves of the conformal mapping of simply connected domains to the interior of a circle: A generalization of a theorem of Eduard Study"), Mathematische Annalen 106, 1932, pp. 574–594
- Zur Theorie der schlichten Funktionen ("On the theory of schlicht functions"), Crelle's Journal 176, 1937, pp. 61–94
- Über den Cartan-Carathéodoryschen Eindeutigkeitssatz ("On the Cartan-Carathéodory uniqueness theorem"), Mathematische Annalen 119, 1943, pp. 131–139
- Analytische Geometrie ("Analytic geometry"), Bibliographisches Institut ("Bibliographical Institute"), Mannheim 1961
- Funktionentheorie ("Complex analysis"), Bibliographisches Institut, Mannheim 1967
- Differentialgeometrie ("Differential geometry"), Bibliographisches Institut, Mannheim 1973, ISBN 3-411-00080-5
