= Mathias Schacht =

German mathematician (born 1977)

Mathias Schacht (born 1977) is a German mathematician who specializes in graph theory.

Schacht earned a diploma in business mathematics in 1999 from Technische Universität Berlin. He did his graduate studies at Emory University, completing a PhD in 2004 under the supervision of Vojtěch Rödl. His dissertation, on hypergraph generalizations of the Szemerédi regularity lemma, won the 2006 Richard Rado Prize of the German Mathematical Society. He worked at the Humboldt University of Berlin as a postdoctoral researcher and acting professor from 2004 until 2009, when he moved to the University of Hamburg. He received his habilitation from Humboldt University in 2010, and has been Heisenberg Professor at the University of Hamburg from 2010 to 2015.

In 2012, Schacht and Rödl won the George Pólya Prize of the Society for Industrial and Applied Mathematics for their research on hypergraph regularity.
