= Agnès Rosenstiehl =

French author and illustrator from Paris (born 1941)

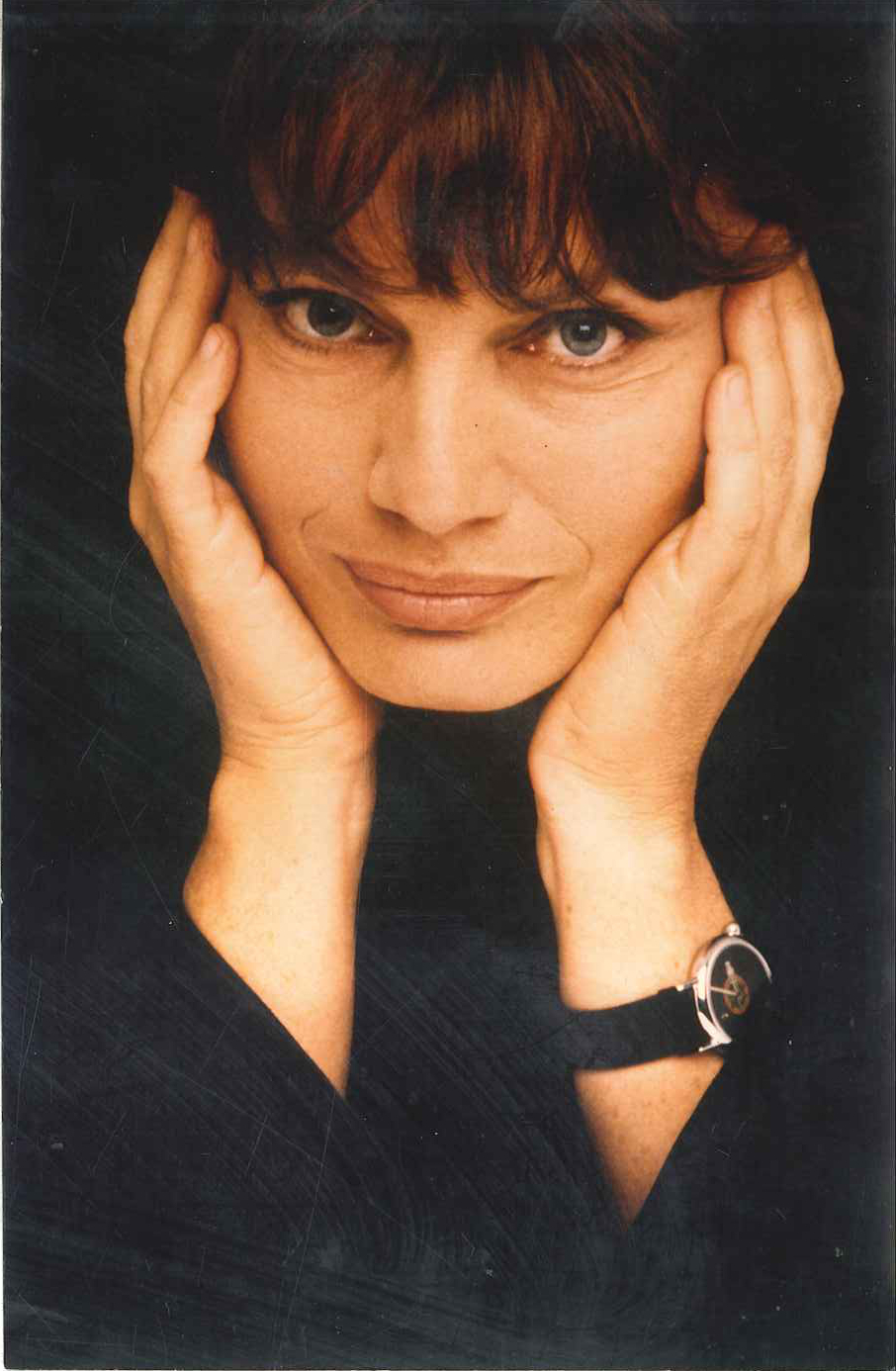
- Portrait of Agnès Rosenstiehl
- Born: Agnes Rosenstiehl; December 4, 1941 (age 84); Paris, France
- Occupations: Illustrator author
- Spouse: Pierre Rosenstiehl
- Writing career
- Notable awards: Deutscher Jugendliteraturpreis; 1986
- Website: www.mimicracra.com

Agnès Rosenstiehl (born December 4, 1941) is a French author and illustrator from Paris. Born from a family of artists, she studied music at the National Conservatory of Music and Dance in Paris and obtained the first harmony prize in 1966 under the name of Agnès Gay. She is best known for a series of children's books following the life of Mimi-Cracra better known to the English language as 'Silly Lilly', and her book "Paris-Pékin par le Transsibérien", which she illustrated and co-wrote with her husband, Pierre Rosenstiehl after an inspirational family trip.

== Career ==
As a mother, she began creating books for children and collaborated with many publishing houses, from the most famous to the smallest and most emerging. She says she is fascinated by Egyptian antiquity, which leads her to draw her characters always in profile, to use solid colors, to embed writing and drawing. She shows a sustained interest in the French language, subject that she explores in many books, such as her Alphabets, or the Book of the French language (illustrated by Pierre Gay). Her production has not stopped since 1968. In 1983, she obtained the "Mention" Premio Grafico Fiera di Bologna for the Gioventù of the Youth Book Fair of Bologna (Italy) for her illustrations of songs chosen by Apple of Api, 66 songs, 6 cannons, 6 christmas. In 1995, Agnes Rosenstiehl received the grand prize of the Société des gens de lettres (SGDL) from the youth book for Les Adverbes. Her archives are entrusted to the Institute of Contemporary Memory (IMEC) in Saint-Germain-la-Blanche-Herbe. In 2000, she received a "Mention" for Introducing Art to Children at the Bologna Children's Book Fair for the collection she directed: "Collection de Peinture", published by Éditions Autrement. She is married to the mathematician Pierre Rosenstiehl.
