= Gérard Denis Cohen =

Gérard Denis Cohen (25 August 1951 – 1 June 2018) was a Computer Science Professor with Telecom ParisTech (ENST) in Paris, France.

Cohen was awarded with Ph.D. from the Pierre and Marie Curie University where he studied under the mentorships of Robert Fortet and Michel Deza. His dissertation thesis was on "Distance Minimale et Enumeration de Poids des Codes Lineaires Mathematics Subject Classification: 05—Combinatorics".

Cohen was appointed a Fellow of the Institute of Electrical and Electronics Engineers (IEEE) in the IEEE Information Theory Society in 2013 for his contributions to combinatorial aspects of coding theory.
