= Isabel Cruz =

American Portuguese computer scientist (died 2021)

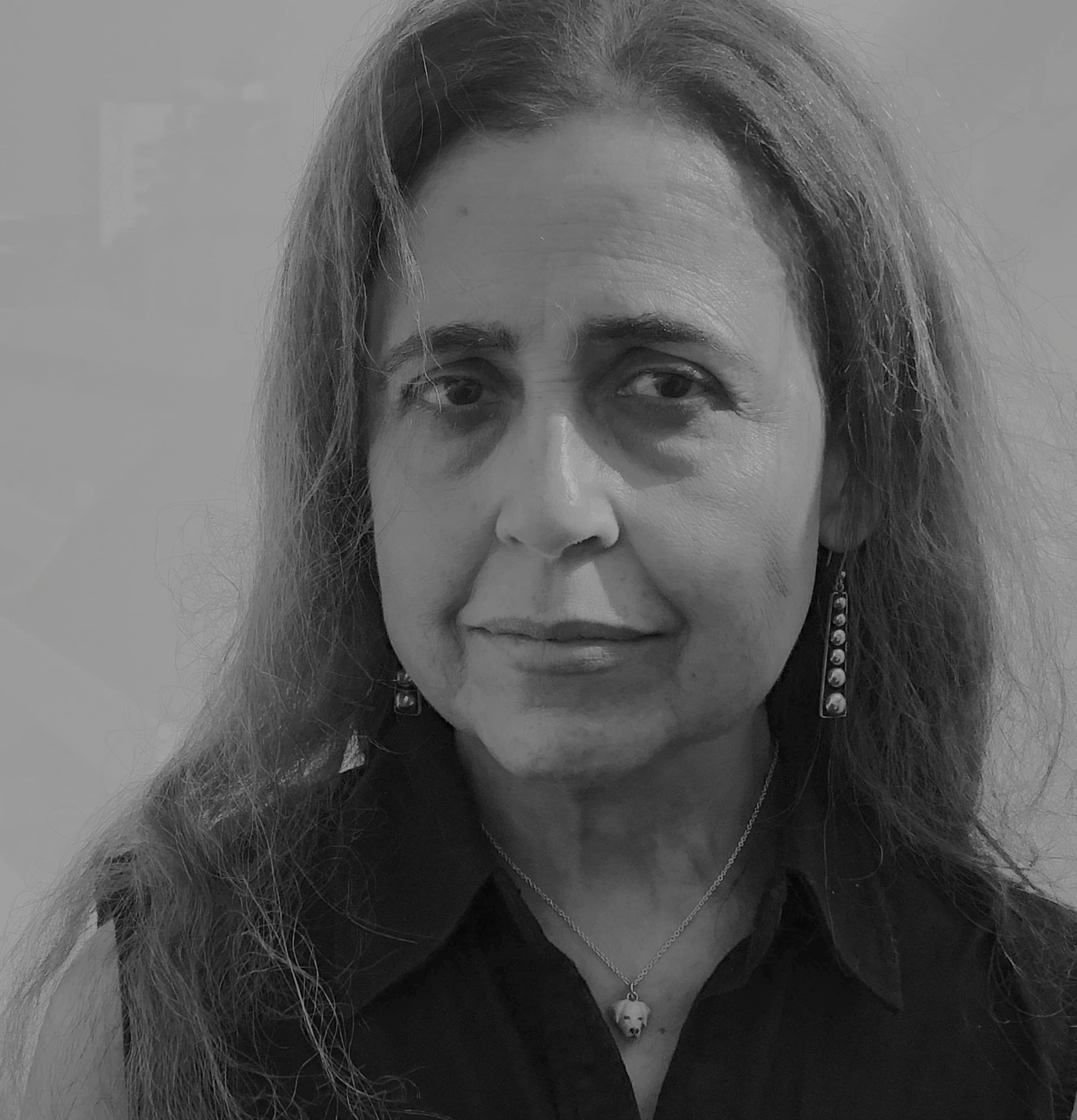
- Born: Lisbon, Portugal
- Died: September 19, 2021
- Education: University of Toronto
- Occupation: Computer scientist
- Awards: AAAS Fellow; UIC Distinguished Professor
- Scientific career
- Fields: Computer Science
- Workplaces: University of Illinois Chicago; Brown University; University of Toronto
- Doctoral advisor: Alberto O. Mendelzon
- Other academic advisors: Paris Kanellakis (postdoctoral)
- Website: https://www.cs.uic.edu/Cruz/

Isabel Cruz (aka Isabel F. Cruz, Maria Isabel Cruz) (died 2021) was an American Portuguese computer scientist known for her research on databases, knowledge representation, geographic information systems, AI, visual languages, graph drawing, user interfaces, multimedia, information retrieval, and security. She was a University of Illinois Chicago Distinguished Professor and a Professor Computer Science in the College of Engineering at the University of Illinois Chicago. She was a Fellow of the American Association for the Advancement of Science.

== Life ==
Cruz was born in Lisbon. In her young life she looked up to Joan of Arc and Marie Curie. Her favorite quotes from Joan & Marie were "All battles are first won or lost, in the mind" and "Have no fear of perfection; you'll never reach it" respectively. completed a MS (1987) and PhD (1993) in computer science at the University of Toronto advised by Alberto O. Mendelzon. She conducted her postdoctoral research at Brown University advised by Paris Kanellakis. She was the recipient of a National Science Foundation CAREER Award in 1996. Cruz joined the University of Illinois Chicago College of Engineering in 2001. She was elected Fellow of the American Association for the Advancement of Science in 2019 and was appointed UIC Distinguished Professor in 2020. Cruz's research focused on databases, big data, geographic information systems, Semantic Web, and knowledge representation. Towards the end of her career, she hoped that her research in data acquisition could be used to aid in novel solutions for social and humanitarian issues.

She died on September 19, 2021.

== Recognition ==
Fellow of the American Association for the Advancement of Science, elected "for her distinguished contributions to visual query languages, information integration and visualization, geospatial computing and for professional leadership in the data management community".

University of Illinois Chicago Distinguished Professor

University of Illinois Faculty Scholar Award

University of Illinois Chicago Great Cities Institute Faculty Scholar Award

University of Illinois Chicago College of Engineering Faculty Research Award

University of Illinois Chicago Teaching Recognition Program Award

Association for Computing Machinery Recognition of Service Award

National Science Foundation CAREER Award

== Personal life ==
Cruz was married to Roberto Tamassia, also a noted computer scientist. She enjoyed several hobbies such as running, cross country skiing, standup paddle boarding, and classical music.

== See also ==
- Women in computing
