= European Journal of Combinatorics =

- Discipline: Combinatorics
- Language: English
- Edited by: Patrice Ossona de Mendez, Marthe Bonamy

Publication details
- History: March 1980 to present
- Publisher: Elsevier (Netherlands)
- Frequency: 4/year (1980–1987); 6/year (1988–1995); 8/year (1996 to present)
- Open access: Hybrid
- Impact factor: 1.0 (2023)

Standard abbreviations
- ISO 4: Eur. J. Comb.
- MathSciNet: European J. Combin.

Indexing
- ISSN: 0195-6698

Links
- Journal homepage

The European Journal of Combinatorics is an international peer-reviewed scientific journal that specializes in combinatorics. The journal primarily publishes papers dealing with mathematical structures within combinatorics and/or establishing direct links between combinatorics and the theories of computing. The journal includes full-length research papers, short notes, and research problems on several topics.

This journal has been founded in 1980 by Michel Deza, Michel Las Vergnas and Pierre Rosenstiehl. The current editor-in-chief is Patrice Ossona de Mendez and the vice editor-in-chief is Marthe Bonamy.

== Abstracting and indexing ==
The journal is abstracted and indexed in

- MathSciNet,
- Science Citation Index Expanded,
- Scopus, and
- ZbMATH Open.

The impact factor for the European Journal of Combinatorics in 2023 was 1.0.
