= Bernhard Korte =

German mathematician and computer scientist (1938–2025)

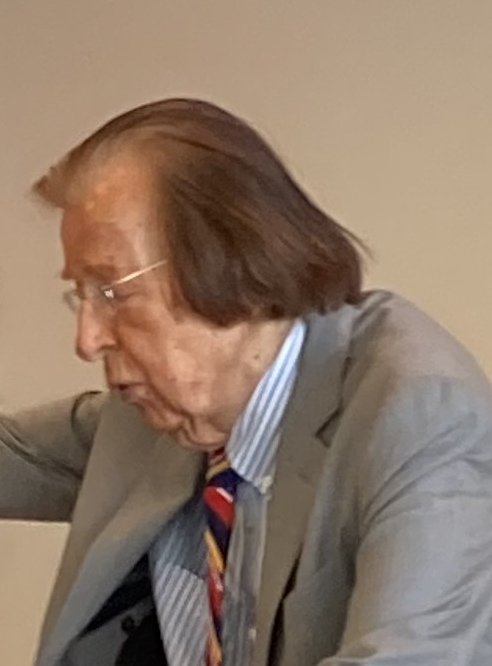
- Bernhard Korte (2023)
- Born: Bernhard H. Korte; 3 November 1938; Bottrop, Gau Westphalia-North, Germany
- Died: 26 April 2025 (aged 86); Bonn, North Rhine-Westphalia, Germany
- Education: University of Bonn (doctorate, habilitation)
- Awards: State Prize of Nordrhein-Westfalen (1997); Grand Cross of the Federal Republic of Germany (2002); Humboldt Prize
- Scientific career
- Fields: Mathematics, computer science, combinatorial optimization
- Workplaces: Regensburg University; Bielefeld University; University of Bonn
- Thesis: Beiträge zur Theorie der Hardy'schen Funktionenklassen (1967)
- Doctoral advisor: Ernst Peschl, Walter Thimm
- Doctoral students: Martin Grötschel

Bernhard H. Korte (3 November 1938 – 26 April 2025) was a German computer scientist, a professor at the University of Bonn and an expert in combinatorial optimization.

== Biography ==
Korte earned his doctorate (Doctor rerum naturalium) from the University of Bonn in 1967. His thesis was entitled "Beiträge zur Theorie der Hardy'schen Funktionenklassen" (translated, "Contributions to the theory of Hardy function classes"), and was supervised by Ernst Peschl and Walter Thimm. He earned his habilitation in 1971, and briefly held faculty positions at Regensburg University and Bielefeld University before joining the University of Bonn as a faculty member in 1972. At the University of Bonn, Korte was the director of the Research Institute for Discrete Mathematics.

Korte was a guest professor at Stanford, Cornell, the University of Waterloo, MIT, Yale and Rutgers University, along with institutions in Rome, Pisa, Barcelona and Rio de Janeiro.

Korte died in Bonn, North Rhine-Westphalia on 26 April 2025, at the age of 86.

== Books ==
- Korte, Bernhard; Lovász, László; Schrader, Rainer (1991), Greedoids, Algorithms and Combinatorics, vol. 4, Springer-Verlag, ISBN 3-540-18190-3.
- Korte, Bernhard; Vygen, Jens (2008), Combinatorial Optimization: Theory and Algorithms, Algorithms and Combinatorics, vol. 21 (4th ed.), Springer-Verlag, ISBN 978-3-540-71843-7.

== Awards and honours ==
In 1997, Korte received the State Prize of Nordrhein-Westfalen, and in 2002 he was awarded the Grand Cross of the Order of Merit of the Federal Republic of Germany. He was also a winner of the Humboldt Prize and a member of the German Academy of Sciences Leopoldina.
