= Daniel Kráľ =

Czech mathematician and computer scientist

Daniel Král
- Born: June 30, 1978 (age 48)
- Education: Charles University, Prague
- Awards: European Prize in Combinatorics (2011), Philip Leverhulme Prize in Mathematics and Statistics (2014), Fellow of the American Mathematical Society (2020)
- Scientific career
- Fields: Mathematician
- Workplaces: Masaryk University, Brno
- Thesis: Computational Complexity and Graph Theory Graph Coloring Problems (2004)
- Doctoral advisor: Jan Kratochvíl

Daniel Kráľ (born June 30, 1978) is a Czech mathematician and computer scientist who works as a professor of mathematics and computer science at the Masaryk University. His research primarily concerns graph theory and graph algorithms.

== Education and career ==
He obtained his Ph.D. from Charles University in Prague in 2004, under the supervision of Jan Kratochvíl. After short-term positions at TU Berlin, Charles University, and the Georgia Institute of Technology, he returned to Charles University as a researcher in 2006, and became a tenured associate professor there in 2010. He was awarded the degree of Doctor of Science by the Academy of Sciences of the Czech Republic in 2012, and in the same year moved to a professorship at the University of Warwick.

In 2018, Kráľ moved back to the Czech Republic and started working at Faculty of Informatics, Masaryk University, accepting the Donald Knuth professorship chair.

== Contributions ==
In the 1970s, Michael D. Plummer and László Lovász conjectured that every bridgeless cubic graph has an exponential number of perfect matchings, strengthening Petersen's theorem that at least one perfect matching exists. In a pair of papers with different sets of co-authors, Kráľ was able to show that this conjecture is true.

== Recognition ==
Kráľ won first place and a gold medal at the International Olympiad in Informatics in 1996.

In 2011, Kráľ won the European Prize in Combinatorics for his work in graph theory, particularly citing his solution to the Plummer–Lovász conjecture and his results on graph coloring. In 2014, he won a Philip Leverhulme Prize in Mathematics and Statistics; the award citation again included Kráľ's research on the Plummer–Lovász conjecture, as well as other publications of Kráľ on pseudorandom permutations and systems of equations.

He was elected as a Fellow of the American Mathematical Society in the 2020 Class, for "contributions to extremal combinatorics and graph theory, and for service to the profession".
