= Packing in a hypergraph =

The partitioning of edges into these two subsets is called a packing, as each edge in each subset has vertices not contained in any other edge within the same subset. The packing is optimal, as there are 2 subsets, and there is no way to make a packing with 1 subset due to some edges covering the same vertices.

In mathematics, a packing in a hypergraph is a partition of the set of the hypergraph's edges into a number of disjoint subsets such that no pair of edges in each subset share any vertex. There are two famous algorithms to achieve asymptotically optimal packing in k-uniform hypergraphs. One of them is a random greedy algorithm which was proposed by Joel Spencer. He used a branching process to formally prove the optimal achievable bound under some side conditions. The other algorithm is called the Rödl nibble and was proposed by Vojtěch Rödl et al. They showed that the achievable packing by the Rödl nibble is in some sense close to that of the random greedy algorithm.

== History ==
The problem of finding the number of such subsets in a k-uniform hypergraph was originally motivated through a conjecture by Paul Erdős and Haim Hanani in 1963. Vojtěch Rödl proved their conjecture asymptotically under certain conditions in 1985. Pippenger and Joel Spencer generalized Rödl's results using a random greedy algorithm in 1989.

== Definition and terminology ==
In the following definitions, the hypergraph is denoted by H=(V,E). H is called a k-uniform hypergraph if every edge in E consists of exactly k vertices.

$P$ is a hypergraph packing if it is a subset of edges in H such that there is no pair of distinct edges with a common vertex.

$H$ is a ($D_0$,$\epsilon$)-good hypergraph if there exists a $D_0$ such that for all $x,y \in V$ and $D\geq D_0$ and both of the following conditions hold.

$$D(1-\epsilon)\leq \text{deg}(x)\leq D(1+\epsilon)$$
$$\text{codeg}(x,y)\leq \epsilon D$$

where the degree $\text{deg} (x)$ of a vertex $x$ is the number of edges that contain $x$ and the codegree $\text{codeg} (x,y)$ of two distinct vertices $x$ and $y$ is the number of edges that contain both vertices.

== Theorem ==
There exists an asymptotic packing P of size at least $\frac{n}{K+1}(1-o(1))$ for a $(K+1)$-uniform hypergraph under the following two conditions,

1. All vertices have the degree of $D(1+o(1))$ in which $D$ tends to infinity.
2. For every pair of vertices shares only $o(D)$ common edges.

where $n$ is the total number of vertices. This result was shown by Pippenger and was later proved by Joel Spencer. To address the asymptotic hypergraph packing problem, Joel Spencer proposed a random greedy algorithm. In this algorithm, a branching process is used as the basis and it was shown that it almost always achieves an asymptotically optimal packing under the above side conditions.

== Asymptotic packing algorithms ==
There are two famous algorithms for asymptotic packing of k-uniform hypergraphs: the random greedy algorithm via branching process, and the Rödl nibble.

=== Random greedy algorithm via branching process ===
Every edge $E \in H$ is independently and uniformly assigned a distinct real "birthtime" $t_E \in [0,D ]$. The edges are taken one by one in the order of their birthtimes. The edge $E$ is accepted and included in $P$ if it does not overlap any previously accepted edges. Obviously, the subset $P$ is a packing and it can be shown that its size is $|P|=\frac{n}{K+1}$ almost surely. To show that, let stop the process of adding new edges at time $c$. For an arbitrary $\gamma >0$, pick $c, D_0, \epsilon$ such that for any $(D_0,\epsilon)$-good hypergraph $f_{x,H}(c)<\gamma^2$ where $f_{x,H}(c)$ denotes the probability of vertex $x$ survival (a vertex survives if it is not in any edges in $P$) until time $c$. Obviously, in such a situation the expected number of $x$ surviving at time $c$ is less than $\gamma^2 n$. As a result, the probability of $x$ surviving being less than $\gamma n$ is higher than $1-\gamma$. In other words, $P_c$ must include at least $(1-\gamma)n$ vertices which means that $|P|\geq (1-\gamma)\frac{n}{K+1}$.

To complete the proof, it must be shown that $\lim_{c\rightarrow \infty} \lim_{x,H} f_{x,H}(c)=0$. For that, the asymptotic behavior of $x$ surviving is modeled by a continuous branching process. Fix $c>0$ and begin with Eve with the birthdate of $c$. Assume time goes backward so Eve gives birth in the interval of $[0,c)$ with a unit density Poisson distribution. The probability of Eve having $k$ birth is $\frac{e^{-c}c^k}{k!}$. By conditioning on $k$ the birthtimes $x_1,...,x_k$ are independently and uniformly distributed on $[0,c)$. Every birth given by Eve consists of $Q$ offspring all with the same birth time say $a$. The process is iterated for each offspring. It can be shown that for all $\epsilon >0$ there exists a $K$ so that with a probability higher than $(1-\epsilon)$, Eve has at most $K$ descendants.

A rooted tree with the notions of parent, child, root, birthorder and wombmate shall be called a broodtree. Given a finite broodtree $T$ we say for each vertex that it survives or dies. A childless vertex survives. A vertex dies if and only if it has at least one brood all of whom survive. Let $f(c)$ denote the probability that Eve survives in the broodtree $T$ given by the above process. The objective is to show $\lim_{c\rightarrow \infty} f(c)=0$ and then for any fixed $c$, it can be shown that $\lim^* f_{x,H}(c)=f(c)$. These two relations complete our argument.

To show $f(c)=0$, let $c\geq 0, \Delta c>0$. For $\Delta c$ small, $f(c+\Delta c)-f(c) \approx -(\Delta c)f(c)^{Q+1}$ as, roughly, an Eve starting at time $c+\Delta c$ might have a birth in time interval $[c, c+\Delta c)$ all of whose children survive while Eve has no births in $[0, c)$ all of whose children survive. Letting $\Delta c\rightarrow 0$ yields the differential equation $f'(c)=-f(c)^{Q+1}$. The initial value $f(0)=1$ gives a unique solution $f(c)=(1+Qc)^{-1/Q}$. Note that indeed $\lim_{c\rightarrow \infty} f(c)=0$.

To prove $\lim^* f_{x,H}(c)=f(c)$, consider a procedure we call History which either aborts or produces a broodtree. History contains a set $T$ of vertices, initially $T=\{x\}$. $T$ will have a broodtree structure with $x$ the root. The $y\in T$ are either processed or unprocessed, $x$ is initially unprocessed. To each $y\in T$ is assigned a birthtime $t_y$, we initialize $t_x=c$. History is to take an unprocessed $y\in T$ and process it as follows. For the value of all $t_E$ with $y\in E$ but with no $x\in E$ that has already been processed, if either some $E$ has $t_E<t_y$ and $y,z\in E$ with $z\in T$ or some $E, E'$ have $t_E,t_{E'}<t_y$ with $y\in E,E'$ and $|E\cup E'|>1$, then History is aborted. Otherwise for each $E$ with $t_E<t_y$ add all $z\in E-\{y\}$ to $T$ as wombmates with parent $y$ and common birthdate $t_E$. Now $y$ is considered processed. History halts, if not aborted, when all $y\in T$ are processed. If History does not abort then root $x$ survives broodtree $T$ if and only if $x$ survives at time $c$. For a fixed broodtree, let $f(T,c)$ denote the probability that the branching process yields broodtree $T$. Then the probability that History does not abort is $f(T,c)$. By the finiteness of the branching process, $\sum f(T,c)=1$, the summation over all broodtrees $T$ and History does not abort. The $lim^*$ distribution of its broodtree approaches the branching process distribution. Thus $\lim^* f_{x,H}(c)=f(c)$.

== The Rödl nibble ==
In 1985, Rödl proved Paul Erdős’s conjecture by a method called the Rödl nibble. Rödl's result can be formulated in form of either packing or covering problem. For $2\leq l<k<n$ the covering number denoted by $M(n,k,l)$ shows the minimal size of a family $\kappa$ of $k$-element subsets of $\{1,...,n\}$ which have the property that every $l$-element set is contained in at least one $A \in \kappa$. Paul Erdős et al. conjecture was

$$\lim_{n\rightarrow \infty} \frac{M(n,k,l)}{{n \choose l}/{k \choose l}}=1$$.

where $2\leq l<k$. This conjecture roughly means that a tactical configuration is asymptotically achievable. One may similarly define the packing number $m(n,k,l)$ as the maximal size of a family $\kappa$ of $k$-element subsets of $\{1,...,n\}$ having the property that every $l$-element set is contained in at most one $A \in \kappa$.

== Packing under the stronger condition ==
In 1997, Noga Alon, Jeong Han Kim, and Joel Spencer also supply a good bound for $\gamma$ under the stronger codegree condition that every distinct pair $v, v'\in V$ has at most one edge in common.

For a k-uniform, D-regular hypergraph on n vertices, if k > 3, there exists a packing P covering all vertices but at most $O(nD^{-1/(k-1)})$. If k = 3 there exists a packing P covering all vertices but at most $O(nD^{-1/2}\ln^{3/2}D)$.

This bound is desirable in various applications, such as Steiner triple system. A Steiner Triple System is a 3-uniform, simple hypergraph in which every pair of vertices is contained in precisely one edge. Since a Steiner Triple System is clearly d=(n-1)/2-regular, the above bound supplies the following asymptotic improvement.

Any Steiner Triple System on n vertices contains a packing covering all vertices but at most $O(n^{1/2}\ln^{3/2}n)$.

This has subsequently improved to $n/3-O(\frac{\log n}{\log \log n})$ and $\frac{n-4}{3}$

== See also ==
- Branching process
- Independent set
- Graph coloring
- Covering number
- Set packing
- Ramsey's theorem
- Set cover problem
- Sphere packing
- Steiner system
- Matching in hypergraphs
