= Peter Eades =

Australian computer scientist

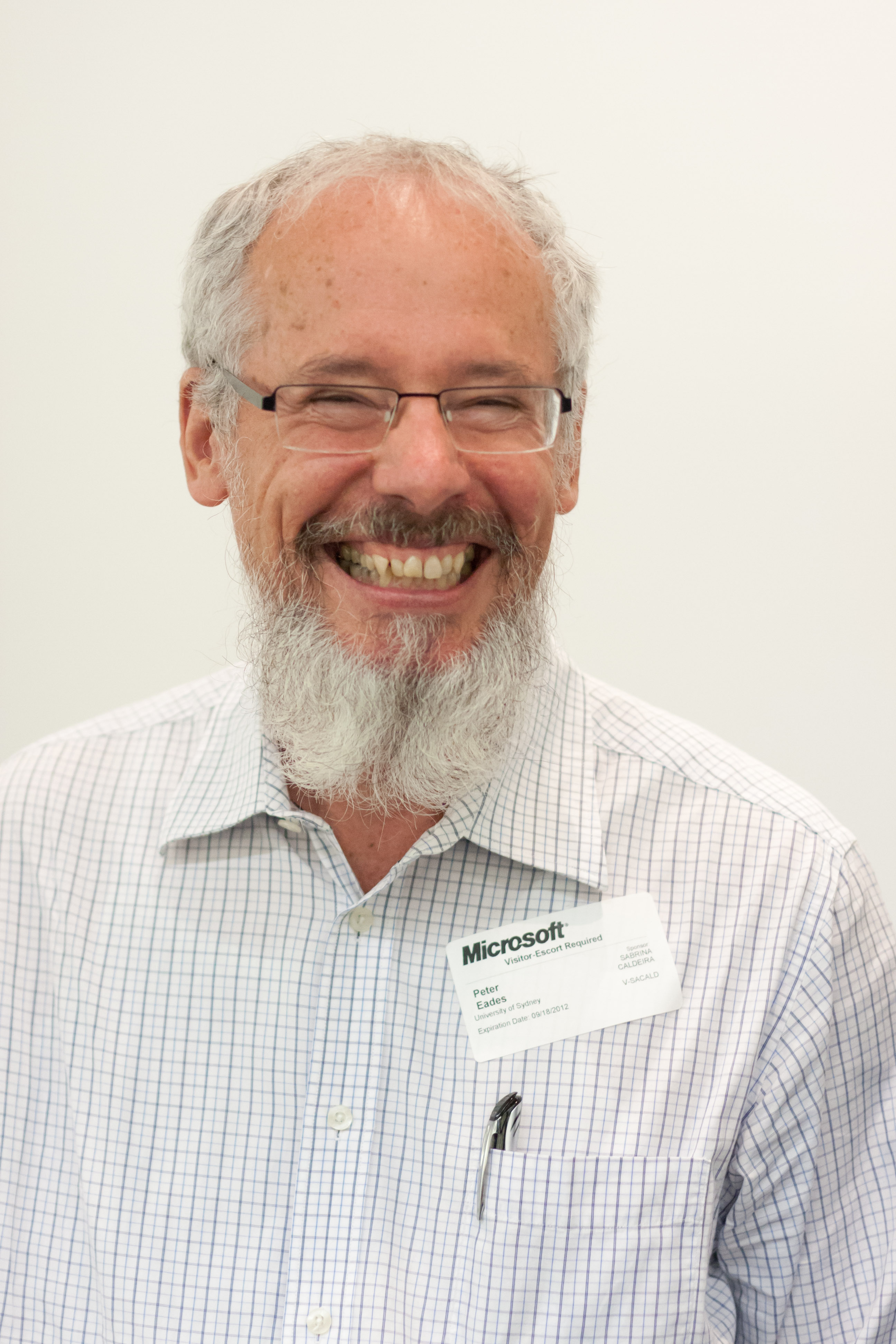
Peter Eades at the Workshop on Theory and Practice of Graph Drawing, 2012

Peter D. Eades (born 8 January 1952) is an Australian computer scientist, an emeritus professor in the School of Information Technologies at the University of Sydney, known for his expertise in graph drawing.

Eades received his bachelor's degree in mathematics from Australian National University in 1974, and his Ph.D. in mathematics from the same university in 1977 under the supervision of Jennifer Seberry. He then did postdoctoral studies at the University of Waterloo before taking an academic position at the University of Queensland, where he remained until 1991. He was a professor of computer science at the University of Newcastle from 1992 to 1999, and joined the University of Sydney faculty in 2000. As well as his faculty position at Sydney, Eades was also a distinguished researcher at NICTA.

Eades is the co-author (with Giuseppe Di Battista, Roberto Tamassia, and Ioannis G. Tollis) of the book Graph drawing: Algorithms for the visualization of graphs, and of the associated survey "Algorithms for drawing graphs: an annotated bibliography". He has also written many highly cited research papers in graph drawing, on topics including spring algorithms, performance speed up with N-body methods, maintenance of the "mental map" in dynamically changing drawings, heuristics for reducing the number of edge crossings in layered graph drawings, and visual display of clustering information in graphs. He was the keynote speaker at the 12th IEEE Symposium on Information Visualization in 2006, was one of three invited speakers at the 19th International Symposium on Algorithms and Computation in 2008, and was one of two invited speakers at the 18th International Symposium on Graph Drawing in 2010. He has been the doctoral advisor of over 30 graduate students.

A workshop in honor of Eades' 60th birthday was held in 2012, as part of the International Symposium on Graph Drawing.
