= Jaroslav Nešetřil =

Czech mathematician (born 1946)

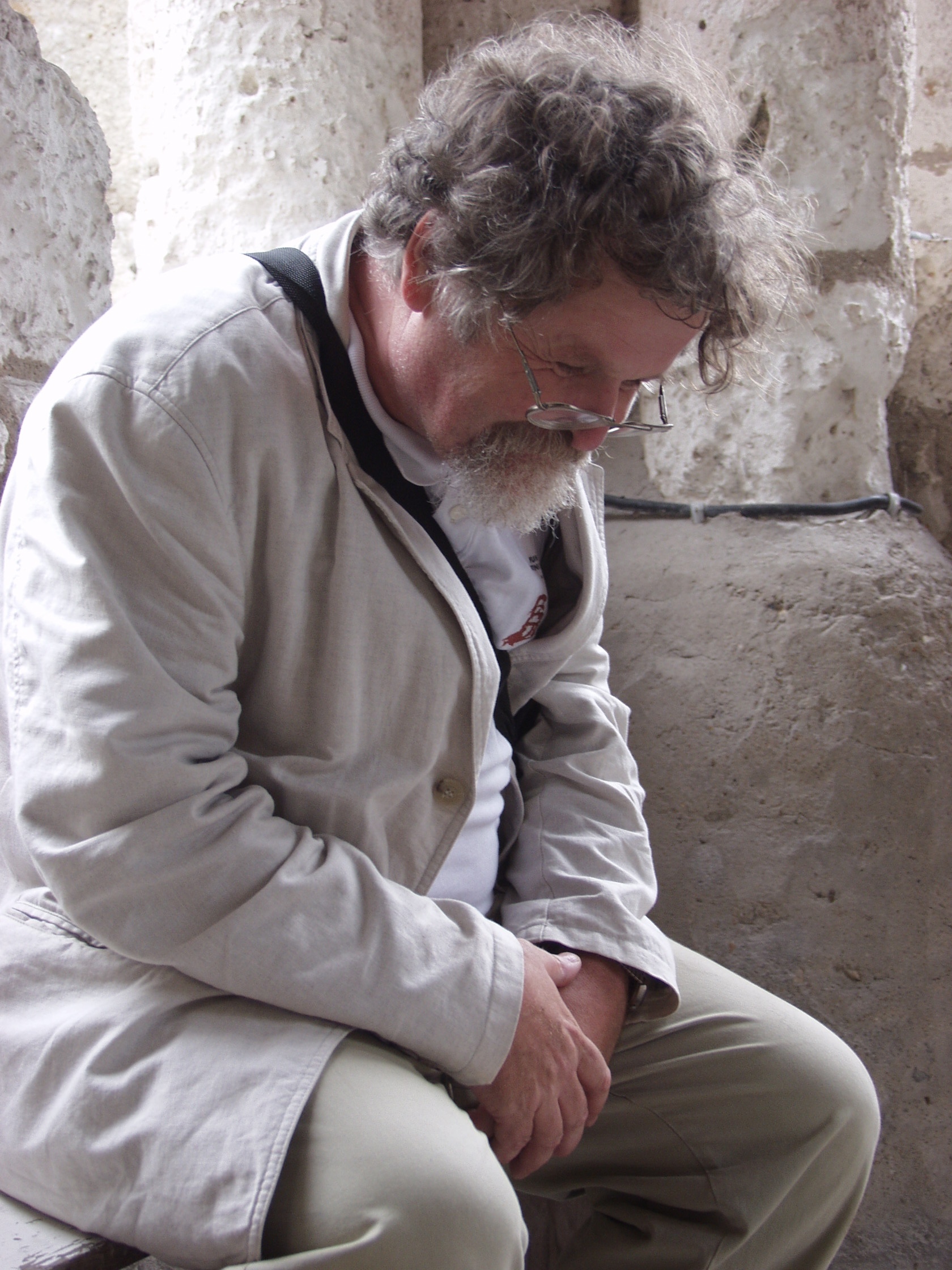
- Jaroslav Nešetřil in 2006
- Born: 13 March 1946 (age 80); Brno, Czechoslovakia
- Education: Charles University, Prague
- Awards: Silver medal of Union of Czechoslovak Mathematicians and Physicists (1977), State Prize of Czechoslovakia (jointly with V. Rödl) (1985), Doctor Honoris Causa of the University of Alaska (2002), Doctor Honoris Causa of the University of Bordeaux 1 (2009), Medal of Merit of Czech Republic (2010), Gold medal of Faculty of Mathematics and Physics, Charles University (2011), elected to Academia Europaea (2012), honorary member of the Hungarian Academy of Sciences (since 2013), Donatio Universitatis Carolinae prize (2018), Nerode Prize (2025).
- Scientific career
- Fields: Mathematician
- Workplaces: Faculty of Mathematics and Physics, Charles University
- Thesis: Structural Ramsey Theorems (1973)
- Doctoral advisor: Aleš Pultr; Gert Sabidussi
- Doctoral students: Zdeněk Dvořák; Jan Kratochvíl; Robin Thomas; Svatopluk Poljak

Jaroslav Nešetřil (Czech pronunciation: [ˈjaroslaf ˈnɛʃɛtr̝̊ɪl]; born 13 March 1946) is a Czech mathematician. His research areas include combinatorics (structural combinatorics, Ramsey theory), graph theory (coloring problems, sparse structures), algebra (representation of structures, categories, homomorphisms), posets (diagram and dimension problems), computer science (complexity, NP-completeness). He works at Charles University in Prague.

== Education and career ==
Nešetřil received his Ph.D. from Charles University in 1973 under the supervision of Aleš Pultr and Gert Sabidussi. He is responsible for more than 300 publications. Since 2006, he is chairman of the Committee of Mathematics of Czech Republic (the Czech partner of IMU).

Jaroslav Nešetřil is Editor in Chief of Computer Science Review and INTEGERS: the Electronic Journal of Combinatorial Number Theory. He is also honorary editor of Electronic Journal of Graph Theory and Applications. Since 2008, Jaroslav Nešetřil belongs to the Advisory Board of the Academia Sinica.

== Awards and honors ==
He was awarded the state prize (1985 jointly with Vojtěch Rödl) for a collection of papers in Ramsey theory. The book Sparsity - Graphs, Structures, and Algorithms he co-authored with Patrice Ossona de Mendez was included in ACM Computing Reviews list of Notable Books and Articles of 2012.

Nešetřil is a corresponding member of the German Academy of Sciences since 1996 and has been declared Doctor Honoris Causa of the University of Alaska (Fairbanks) in 2002. He has also been declared Doctor Honoris Causa of the University of Bordeaux 1 in 2009; the speech he made in French at this occasion attracted a great deal of attention. He received in 2010 the Medal of Merit of Czech Republic and the Gold medal of Faculty of Mathematics and Physics, Charles University in 2011. In 2012, he has been elected to the Academia Europaea. Also, he has been elected honorary member of the Hungarian Academy of Sciences in 2013.

He was an invited speaker of the European Congress of Mathematics, in Amsterdam, 2008, and invited speaker (by both the Logic and Foundations and Combinatorics sections) at the Combinatorics session of the International Congress of Mathematicians, in Hyderabad, 2010.

In 2018, on the occasion of the 670th anniversary of the establishment of Charles University, Nešetřil has received from the rector of Charles university the Donatio Universitatis Carolinae prize “for his contribution to mathematics and for his leading role in establishing a world-renowned group in discrete mathematics at Charles University”.

Together with Patrice Ossona de Mendez, he received the 2025 Nerode Prize for his work on Sparsity for the papers Grad and classes with bounded expansion I. Decompositions, Grad and classes with bounded expansion II. Algorithmic aspects, First order properties on nowhere dense structures, and On nowhere dense graphs.

== Books ==
- Hell, Pavol; Nešetřil, Jaroslav (2004). Graphs and Homomorphisms (Oxford Lecture Series in Mathematics and Its Applications). Oxford University Press. ISBN 0-19-852817-5.
- Matoušek, Jiří; Nešetřil, Jaroslav (1998). Invitation to Discrete Mathematics. Oxford University Press. ISBN 0-19-850207-9. 2008 2nd edition (hbk); 2009 2nd edition (pbk)
- Matoušek, Jiří; Nešetřil, Jaroslav (2002). Diskrete Mathematik: Eine Entdeckungsreise (in German). Translated by Mielke, Heinz. Springer. ISBN 3-540-42386-9.
- Matoušek, Jiří; Nešetřil, Jaroslav (2006). Introduction aux mathématiques discrètes (in French). Springer. ISBN 228720010X.
- Nešetřil, Jaroslav; Ossona de Mendez, Patrice (2012). Sparsity - Graphs, Structures, and Algorithms (Algorithms and Combinatorics, Vol. 28). Springer. ISBN 978-3-642-27874-7.
- Nešetřil, Jaroslav; Rödl, Vojtěch, eds. (1991). Mathematics of Ramsey Theory (Algorithms and Combinatorics, Vol. 5). Springer. ISBN 0-387-18191-1. 2012 pbk reprint
