= Monique Laurent =

French computer scientist and mathematician

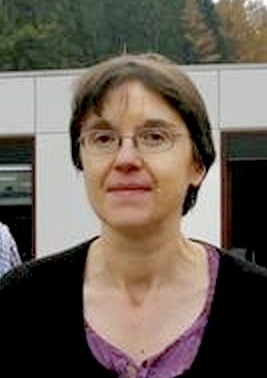
- Laurent at Oberwolfach in 2011
- Born: Monique Laurent; 1960
- Education: Paris Diderot University
- Scientific career
- Fields: Mathematical optimization
- Workplaces: Centrum Wiskunde & Informatica; Tilburg University; CNRS
- Thesis: Geométries Laminées: Aspects Algébriques et Algorithmiques (1986)
- Doctoral advisor: Michel Deza

Monique Laurent (born 1960) is a French computer scientist and mathematician who is an expert in mathematical optimization. She is a researcher at the Centrum Wiskunde & Informatica in Amsterdam where she is also a member of the Management Team. Laurent also holds a part-time position as a professor of econometrics and operations research at Tilburg University.

== Education and career ==
Laurent earned a doctorate from Paris Diderot University in 1986, under the supervision of Michel Deza. She worked at CNRS from 1988 to 1997, when she moved to CWI. She took a second position at Tilburg in 2009.

== Book ==
With Deza, Laurent is the author of the book Geometry of Cuts and Metrics (Algorithms and Combinatorics 15, Springer, 1997).

== Awards and honors ==
She was an invited speaker at the International Congress of Mathematicians in 2014. She was elected as a fellow of the Society for Industrial and Applied Mathematics in 2017, "for contributions to discrete and polynomial optimization and revealing interactions between them". She has been a member of the Royal Netherlands Academy of Arts and Sciences since 2018. In 2024, she was awarded a Gauss Lecture by the German Mathematical Society.
