= Vojtěch Rödl =

Czech American mathematician

- Born: 1 April 1949 (age 77)
- Education: Charles University, Prague
- Known for: Combinatorics
- Scientific career
- Fields: Mathematics
- Thesis: (1976)
- Doctoral advisor: Zdeněk Hedrlín
- Website: www.math.emory.edu/~rodl/

Vojtěch Rödl (born 1 April 1949) is a Czech American mathematician, Samuel Candler Dobbs Professor at Emory University. He is noted for his contributions mainly to combinatorics having authored hundreds of research papers.

== Academic Background ==
Rödl obtained his PhD from the School of Mathematics and Physics at Charles University in 1976. His supervisor was Zdeněk Hedrlín.

From 1973 to 1987 he lectured at the School of Nuclear and Physical Engineering at the Czech Technical University in Prague. He has held visiting positions in various institutions including McMaster University, University of Waterloo, Bell Laboratories, Microsoft, Charles University, Mathematical Institute of the Czech Academy of Science, Bielefeld University, as well as at Humboldt University in Berlin.

He serves on the editorial board of several international journals.

He has given lectures at many conferences, including plenary address in 2014 at the International Congress of Mathematicians in Seoul and an invited lecture in 1990 at the International Congress of Mathematicians in Kyoto.

He has several joint publications with Paul Erdős, and so has Erdős number one.

== Research ==
Rödl has published more than four hundred papers, mostly in combinatorics. He is mostly known for his contributions to Ramsey theory, extremal problems, and probabilistic combinatorics.

== Awards ==
- 1977 – Silver medal of the Union of Czechoslovak Mathematicians and Physicists
- 1985 – Czechoslovak State prize (jointly with Jaroslav Nešetřil)
- 1996 – Humboldt Prize
- 2005 – Felber Medal (Czech Technical University)
- 2011 – Bolzano Medal (Czech Academy of Science)
- 2012 – George Pólya Prize in Applied Combinatorics (jointly with Mathias Schacht)
- 2013 – Neuron Prize
- 2003 and 2017 Honorary doctorate (Technical University of Liberec and Czech Technical University Prague respectively)

In 1983 with Péter Frankl he solved a 1000$ problem of Paul Erdős. Since 2010 Rödl has been a Foreign Fellow of the Czech Learned Society.

== Books ==
- Nešetřil, Jaroslav; Rödl, Vojtěch, eds. (1991). Mathematics of Ramsey Theory. Algorithms and Combinatorics. Vol. 5. Springer. ISBN 0-387-18191-1. 2012 pbk reprint

== See also ==
- Packing in a hypergraph
- Frankl–Rödl graph
- Hypergraph removal lemma
