= Joel Spencer =

American mathematician (born 1946)

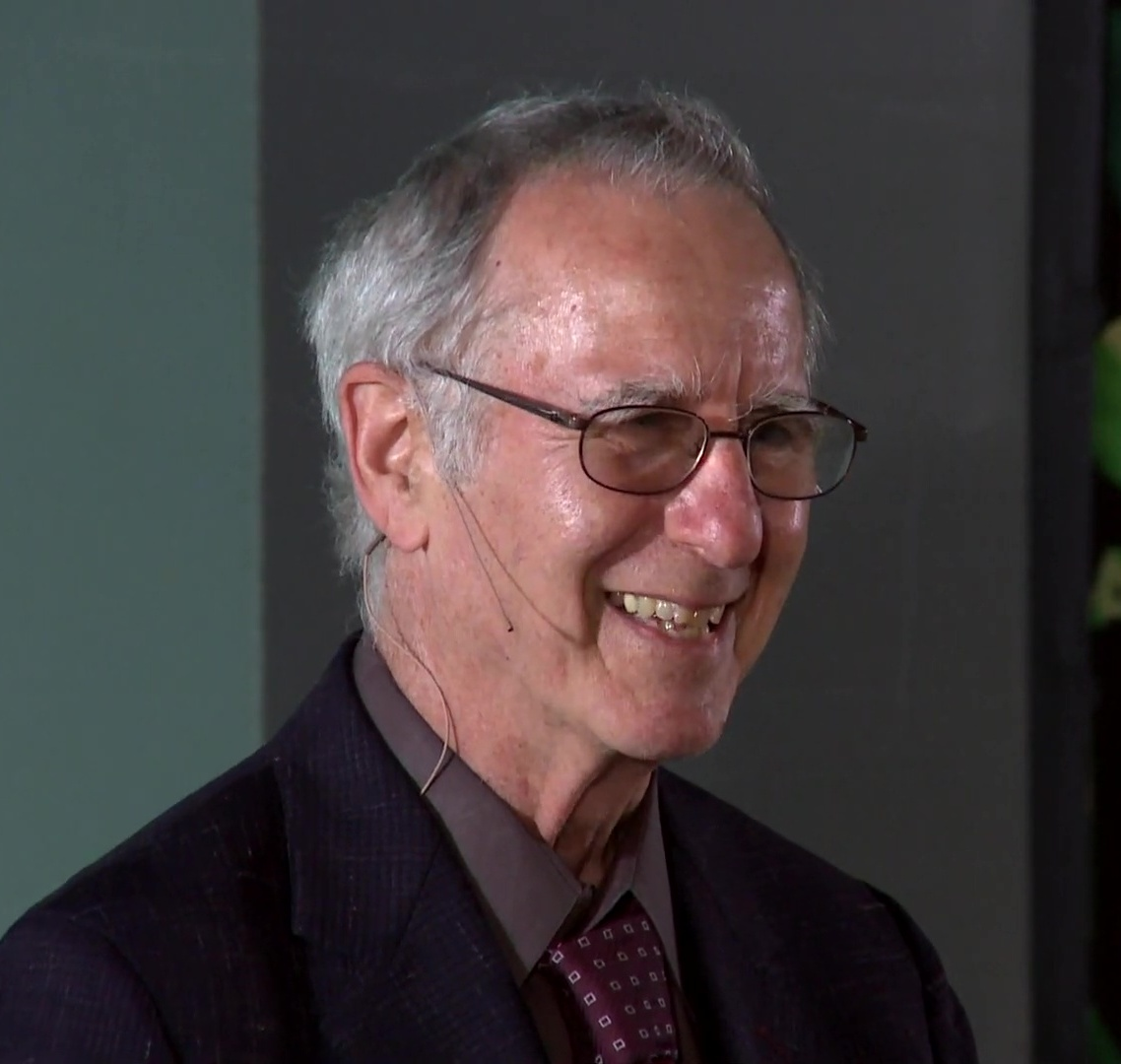
- Born: April 20, 1946 (age 80)
- Education: MIT, Harvard University
- Scientific career
- Fields: Mathematics
- Workplaces: New York University
- Doctoral advisor: Andrew Gleason
- Doctoral students: Prasad V. Tetali

Joel Harold Spencer (born April 20, 1946) is an American mathematician. He is a combinatorialist who has worked on probabilistic methods in combinatorics and on Ramsey theory. He received his doctorate from Harvard University in 1970, under the supervision of Andrew Gleason. Spencer is currently (as of 2018) a professor at the Courant Institute of Mathematical Sciences of New York University. His work was heavily influenced by Paul Erdős, with whom Spencer co-authored many papers (giving him an Erdős number of 1).

In 1963, while studying at the Massachusetts Institute of Technology, Spencer became a Putnam Fellow. In 1984, he received a Lester R. Ford Award. He was an Erdős Lecturer at Hebrew University of Jerusalem in 2001. In 2012, he became a fellow of the American Mathematical Society. He was elected as a fellow of the Society for Industrial and Applied Mathematics in 2017, "for contributions to discrete mathematics and theory of computing, particularly random graphs and networks, Ramsey theory, logic, and randomized algorithms". In 2021, he received the Leroy P. Steele Prize for Mathematical Exposition with his coauthor Noga Alon for their book The Probabilistic Method.

== Selected publications ==
- Probabilistic methods in combinatorics, with Paul Erdős, New York: Academic Press, 1974.
- Ramsey theory, with Bruce L. Rothschild and Ronald L. Graham, New York: Wiley, 1980; 2nd ed., 1990.
- Ten lectures on the probabilistic method, Philadelphia: Society for Industrial and Applied Mathematics, 1987; 2nd ed., 1994.
- The strange logic of random graphs, Berlin: Springer-Verlag, 2001.
- The probabilistic method, with Noga Alon, New York: Wiley, 1992; 2nd ed., 2000; 3rd ed., 2008; 4th ed., 2016.
- Deterministic random walks on regular trees, American Mathematical Society, New York, 2008.
- Asymptopia, with Laura Florescu, American Mathematical Society, 2014.

== See also ==
- Packing in a hypergraph
