= International Symposium on Graph Drawing =

Annual academic conference

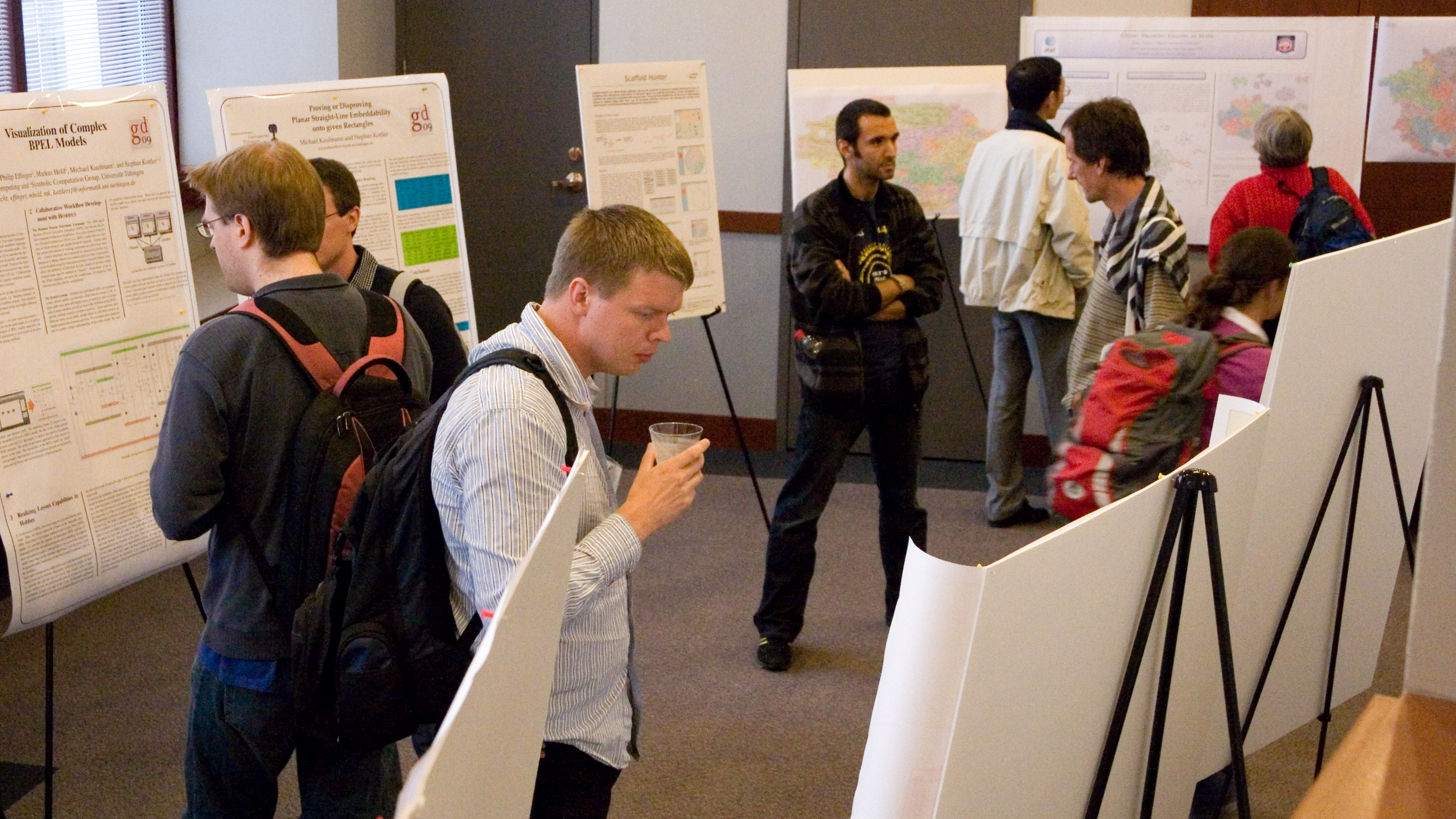
The poster session at Graph Drawing 2009 in Chicago.

The International Symposium on Graph Drawing (GD) is an annual academic conference in which researchers present peer reviewed papers on graph drawing, information visualization of network information, geometric graph theory, and related topics.

== Significance ==
The Graph Drawing symposia have been central to the growth and development of graph drawing as a research area: as Herman et al. write, "the Graph Drawing community grew around the yearly Symposia." Nguyen lists Graph Drawing as one of "several good conferences which directly or indirectly concern with information visualization", and Wong et al. report that its proceedings "provide a wealth of information". In a 2003 study the symposium was among the top 30% of computer science research publication venues, ranked by impact factor.

== History ==
The first symposium was held in Marino, near Rome, Italy, in 1992, organized by Giuseppe Di Battista, Peter Eades, Pierre Rosenstiehl, and Roberto Tamassia. The first two symposia did not publish proceedings, but reports are available online. From 1994 to 2023, the proceedings of the symposia have been published by Springer-Verlag's Lecture Notes in Computer Science series. Since 2024, the conference proceedings have been published by the Leibniz International Proceedings in Informatics.

Countries in which the conference has been held include Australia, Austria, Canada, the Czech Republic, France, Germany, Greece, Ireland, Italy, Japan, the Netherlands, Spain, and the United States.

== Citation data and its analysis ==
A citation graph having vertices representing the papers in the 1994–2000 Graph Drawing symposia and having edges representing citations between these papers was made available as part of the graph drawing contest associated with the 2001 symposium. The largest connected component of this graph consists of 249 vertices and 642 edges; clustering analysis reveals several prominent subtopics within graph drawing that are more tightly connected, including three-dimensional graph drawing and orthogonal graph drawing.

== See also ==
- The list of computer science conferences contains other academic conferences in computer science.
