= Pavol Hell =

Canadian mathematician and computer scientist

Pavol Hell is a Canadian mathematician and computer scientist, born in Czechoslovakia. He is a professor of computing science at Simon Fraser University. Hell started his mathematical studies at Charles University in Prague, and moved to Canada in August 1968 after the Warsaw Pact invasion of Czechoslovakia. He obtained his MSc from McMaster University in Hamilton, under the joint supervision of Gert Sabidussi and Alex Rosa, and his PhD at the Universite de Montreal, with Gert Sabidussi. In his PhD research he pioneered, on the suggestion of Gert Sabidussi, the study of graph retracts. He describes his area of interest as "computational combinatorics", including algorithmic graph theory and complexity of graph problems. His current focus is on nicely structured graph classes, and on the complexity of various versions of graph homomorphism problems.

Hell has written the book Graph and Homomorphisms with his long-term collaborator Jaroslav Nešetřil, and many highly cited papers, including "On the complexity of H-coloring" also with Nešetřil, "On the history of the minimum spanning tree problem", with Ron Graham, "On the completeness of a generalized matching problem" with David Kirkpatrick, and "List homomorphisms and circular arc graphs" with Tomas Feder and Jing Huang. He is a managing editor of the Journal of Graph Theory, and was named a fellow of the Society for Industrial and Applied Mathematics (SIAM) in 2012.
