= Roberto Tamassia =

Italian-American computer scientist

Roberto Tamassia is an American-Italian computer scientist, the Plastech Professor of Computer Science at Brown University, and served as the chair of the Brown Computer Science department from 2007 to 2014. His research specialty is in the design and analysis of algorithms for graph drawing, computational geometry, and computer security. He is also the author of several textbooks.

== Professional biography ==
Tamassia received a laurea (the Italian equivalent of an M.S. degree) from the University of Rome "La Sapienza" in 1984, and a Ph.D. from the University of Illinois Urbana-Champaign under the supervision of Franco Preparata in 1988. He then took a faculty position at Brown; he has also held visiting positions at the University of Texas at Dallas, the Consiglio Nazionale delle Ricerche, and La Sapienza.

Tamassia is an ISI highly cited researcher. He was one of the original organizers of the International Symposium on Graph Drawing, and was co-chair of that conference in 1994; he has also been co-chair of the semiannual Workshop on Algorithms and Data Structures (1997, 1999, and 2001) and the annual Workshop on Algorithms and Experiments (2005). He is founding editor-in-chief (since 1996) of the Journal of Graph Algorithms and Applications as well as belonging to several other journal editorial boards.

== Awards and honors ==
In 2006, the IEEE Computer Society gave Tamassia their Technical Achievement Award "for pioneering the field of graph drawing and for outstanding contributions to the design of graph and geometric algorithms." In 2008, he was elected as an IEEE Fellow. In 2012 he was named a fellow of the Association for Computing Machinery "for contributions to graph drawing, algorithms and data structures and to computer science education", and also named a fellow of the American Association for the Advancement of Science.

== Personal life ==
Tamassia was married to Isabel Cruz, also a noted computer scientist, until her death in 2021.

== Books ==
- Goodrich, M. T.; Tamassia, R. (1998), Data Structures and Algorithms in Java, Wiley. Fourth edition, 2005.
- Di Battista, G.; Eades, P.; Tamassia, R.; Tollis, I. G. (1999), Graph Drawing, Prentice-Hall, ISBN 978-0-13-301615-4.
- Goodrich, M. T.; Tamassia, R. (2002), Algorithm Design, Wiley.
- Goodrich, M. T.; Tamassia, R.; Mount, D. (2003), Data Structures and Algorithms in C++, Wiley
