= Elena Deza =

Russian mathematician

Elena Ivanovna Deza (Russian: Елена Ивановна Деза, née Panteleeva; born 23 August 1961) is a French and Russian mathematician known for her books on metric spaces and figurate numbers.

== Education and career ==
Deza was born on 23 August 1961 in Volgograd, and is a French and Russian citizen. She earned a diploma in mathematics in 1983, a candidate's degree (doctorate) in mathematics and physics in 1993, and a docent's certificate in number theory in 1995, all from Moscow State Pedagogical University.

From 1983 to 1988, Deza was an assistant professor of mathematics at Moscow State Forest University. In 1988 she moved to Moscow State Pedagogical University; she became a lecturer there in 1993, a reader in 1994, and a full professor in 2006.

== Books ==
As well as many Russian-language books, Deza's books include:

- Dictionary of Distances (with Michel Deza, Elsevier, 2006)
- Encyclopedia of Distances (with Michel Deza, Springer, 2009; 4th ed., 2016)
- Figurate Numbers (with Michel Deza, World Scientific, 2012)
- Generalizations of Finite Metrics and Cuts (with Michel Deza and Mathieu Dutour Sikirić, World Scientific, 2016)
- Mersenne Numbers and Fermat Numbers (World Scientific, 2021)
