= List of universities and colleges in Wrocław =

Wrocław is one of the largest university centers in Poland. About 150 thousand people study here, both full-time and part-time.

== State universities ==
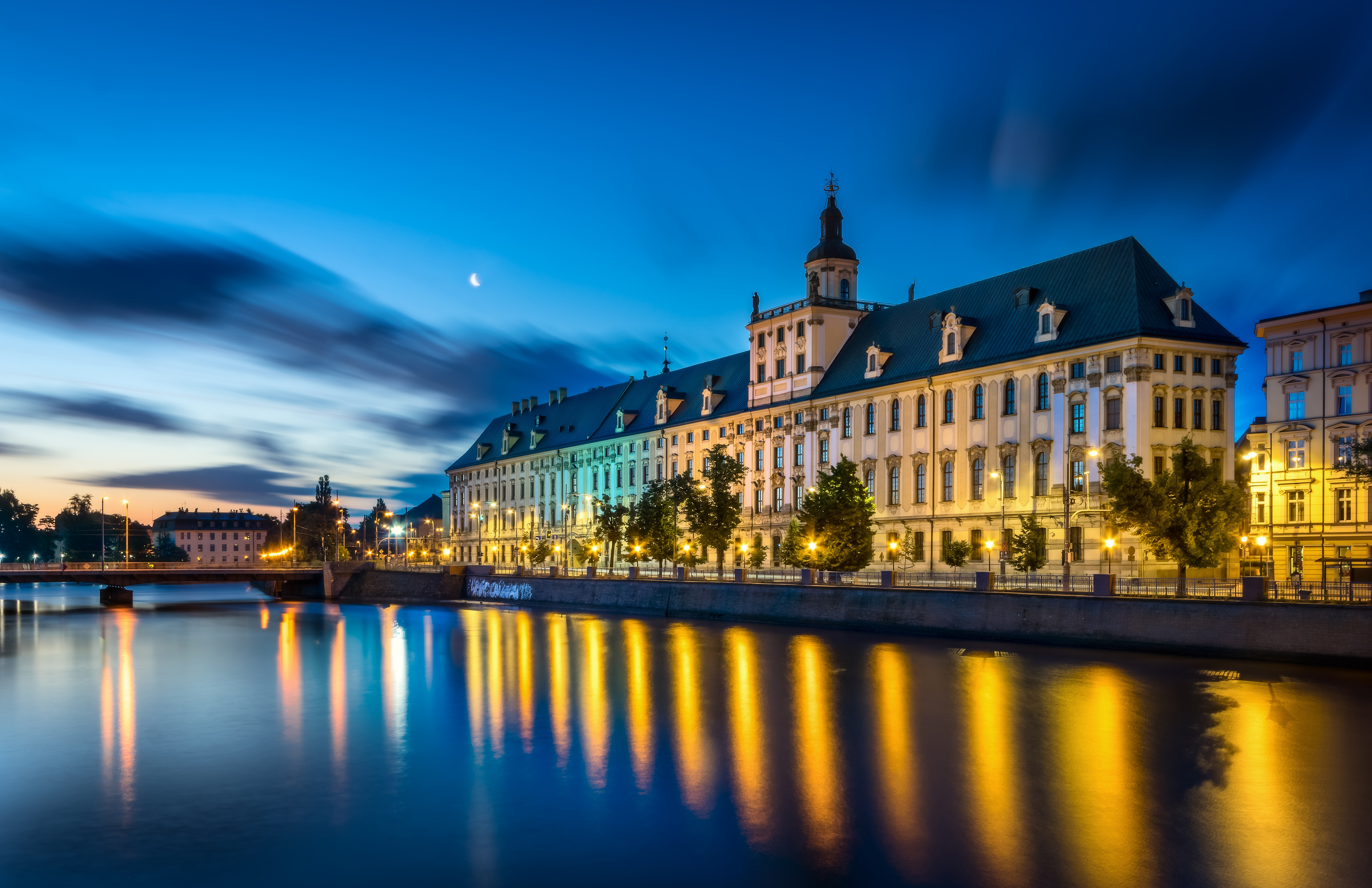
University of Wrocław

- K. Lipiński Academy of Music
- E. Geppert Academy of Fine Arts
- S. Wyspiański Academy of Theatre Arts
- T. Kościuszko Land Forces Academy
- Academy of Physical Education
- Wroclaw University of Technology
- University of Economics
- Piast Medical University of Silesia
- University of Life Sciences
- University of Wroclaw

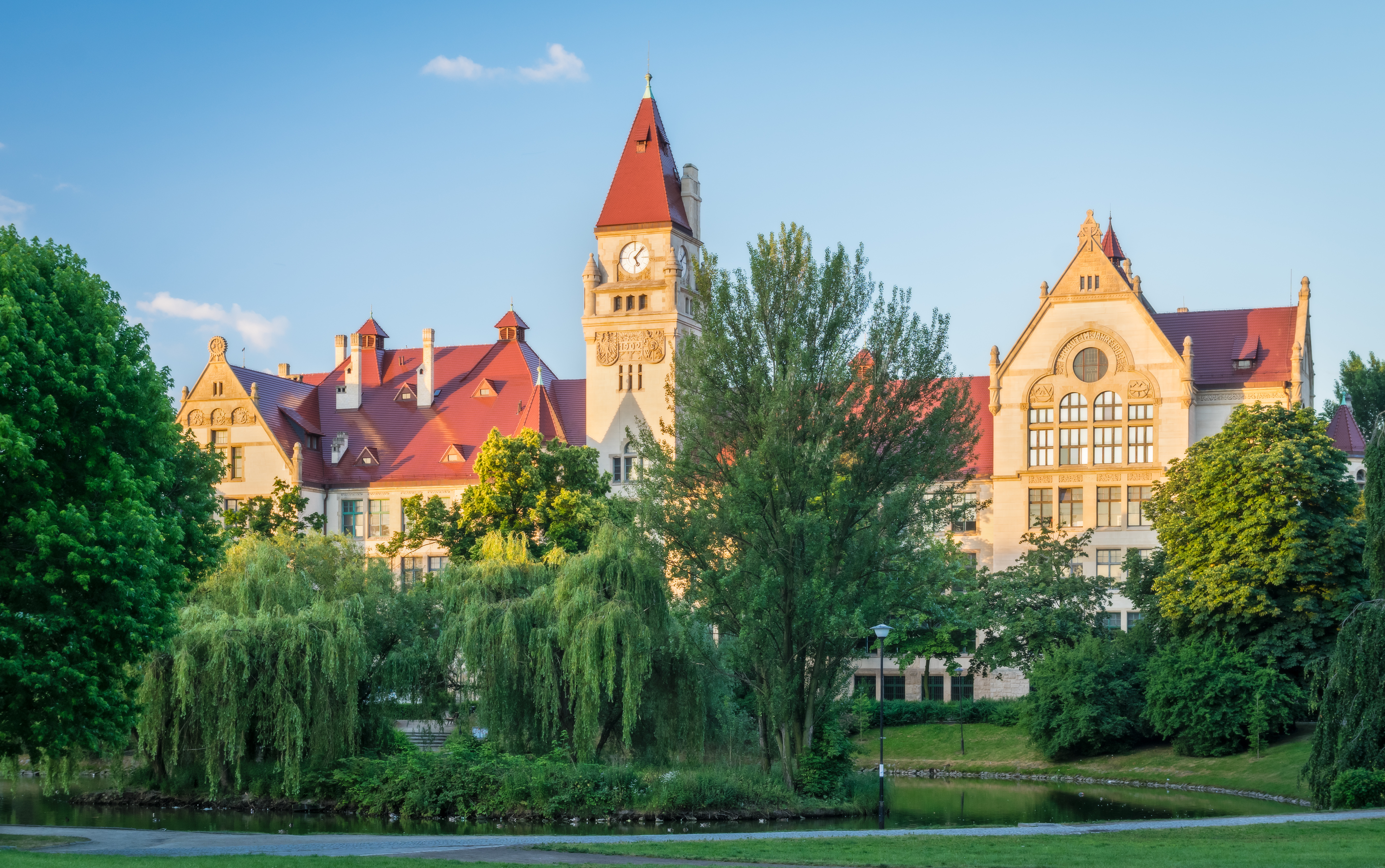
Wroclaw University of Technology

== Non-state universities ==
- Lower Silesian University of Applied Sciences
- Evangelical College of Theology
- Metropolitan Higher Seminary
- International School of Logistics and Transport
- Non-public Higher School of Medicine
- Papal Theological Faculty
- SWPS University of Humanities and Social Sciences in Warsaw, Branch Office in Wrocław
- University of Arts and Crafts and Management
- Wrocław University of Applied Computer Science
- School of Banking
- University of Philology
- University of Physiotherapy
- College of Commerce
- Higher School of Humanities
- Copernicus University of Information Technology and Management
- Chodkowska University of Law
- Higher School of Management
- University of Management and Coaching
- Franciscan Theological Seminary
- Seminary of the Fathers of Claretinas
- Heart Fathers' Major Seminary
