= Schinzel =

Schinzel is a German language metonymic occupational surname for a weaver. Notable people with the surname include:

- Andrzej Schinzel (1937–2021), Polish mathematician
- Britta Schinzel (born 1943), German mathematician
- Dieter Schinzel (1942-2024), German politician
- Silvia Schinzel (born 1958), Austrian sprinter
- Władysław Schinzel (born 1943), Polish chess player
