= Eichhorn =

Eichhorn is a German surname meaning “squirrel”. Notable people with the surname include:

- Albert Eichhorn (1856–1926), historian of religion
- Bert Eichhorn (born 1956), German lawyer and university lecturer
- Christoph Eichhorn (born 1957), German television actor and director
- David Max Eichhorn (1906–1986), American rabbi, army chaplain and author
- Dennis Eichhorn (1945-2015), American writer
- Elizabeth Eichhorn (born 1957), Argentine sculptor
- Emil Eichhorn (1863–1925), German politician and police chief
- Hans Eichhorn (1956–2020), Austrian writer and poet
- Hermann von Eichhorn (1848–1918), German World War I field marshall
- Jan-Armin Eichhorn (born 1981), German luger
- Johann Gottfried Eichhorn (1753–1827), German theologian
- Karl Friedrich Eichhorn (1781–1854), German jurist
- Kennet Eichhorn (born 2009), German footballer
- Kurt Eichhorn (1908–1994), German conductor
- Lisa Eichhorn (born 1952), American actress, writer and producer
- Maria Eichhorn (born 1962), German installation artist
- Maria Eichhorn (politician) (born 1948), German politician
- Mark Eichhorn (born 1960), American baseball player
- Urs Eichhorn (born 1979), Swiss curler

== See also ==
- Eichhorn in East Prussia, the German name of Wiewiórki, Warmian-Masurian Voivodeship
- The similarly-spelt German surname Aichhorn
