= Bert Eichhorn =

German lawyer and university lecturer

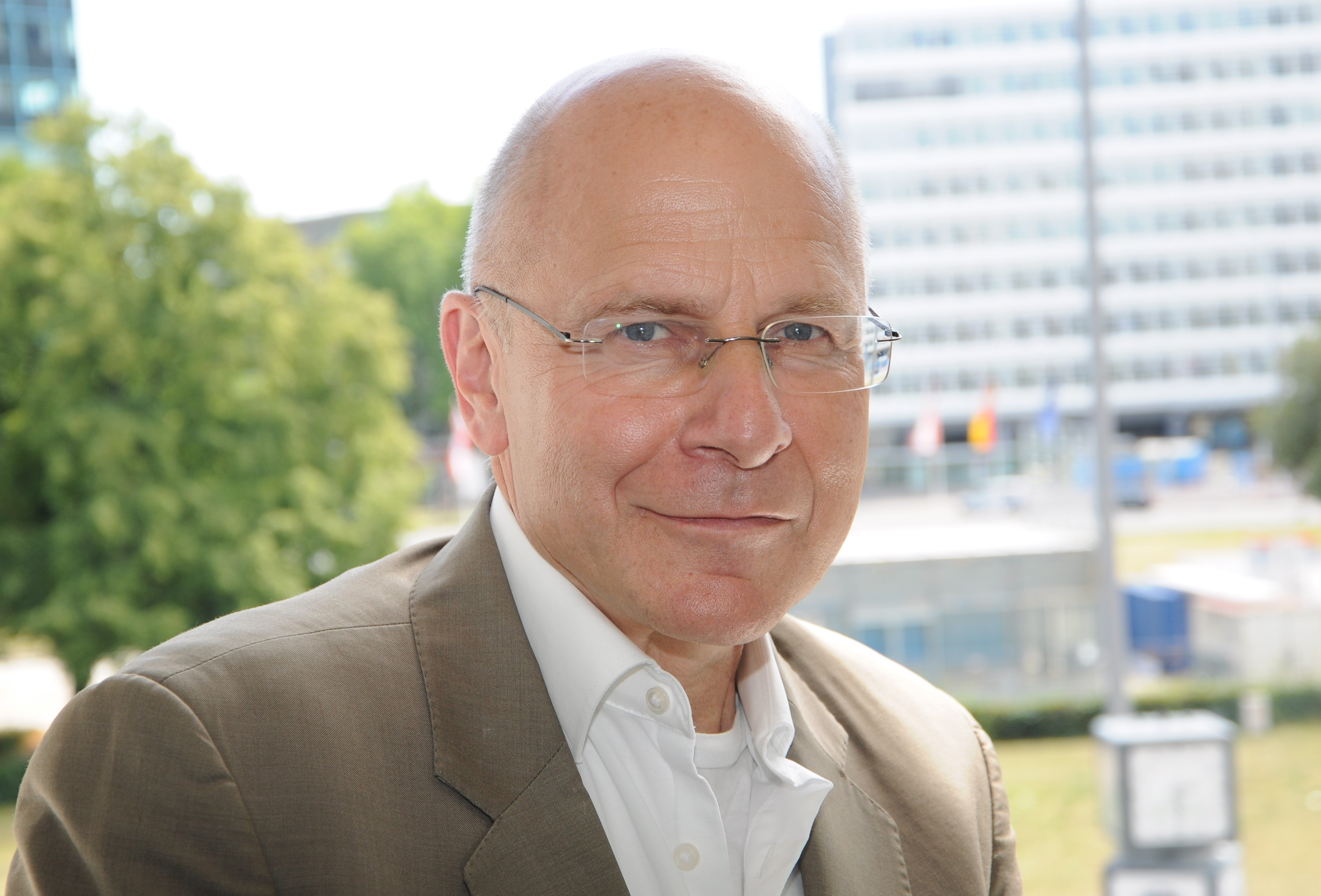
Bert Eichhorn (2019)

Bert Wolfgang Eichhorn (born 1956 in Berlin) is a German lawyer and university lecturer.

== Life ==
Eichhorn was a lawyer from 1989 to 2010. He received his doctorate in Cologne in 1991. He wrote his doctoral thesis on the topic of state responsibility, reparations and restitution in Germany after the Second World War.

Since 2008, he has been Professor of International Business Law and European Law at the private SRH Hochschule Berlin and since 2014 external Professor at the University of Granada. He has been a guest lecturer at Beuth University of Applied Sciences Berlin, Wroclaw University of Technology, Neisse University in Liberec, Jelenia Gora and Görlitz, Marmara Üniversitesi in Istanbul, Grande école INSEEC Business School) in Paris and Bordeaux, and Universidad Autonoma Querétaro in Mexico.

He is the head of the Master of Entrepreneurship program and the premium-accredited Master of International Management program at SRH Hochschule Berlin and teaches contract knowledge management, international business law, European law, negotiation and conflict management and internet law. In addition, he is Vice President for International Affairs at SRH Hochschule Berlin.

Eichhorn is Director of the CMI Berlin Research Institute at SRH Hochschule Berlin. His research focuses on contract management, transcultural risk management and legal education for management.

== Publications ==
- Internetrecht. Ein Wegweiser für Nutzer und Web-Verantwortliche. Beuth, Berlin 2007.
- with Ralph Schumann: Der Vertrag als Kooperations- und als Kommunikationstreiber. Vom klassischen zu einem prozessorientierten Vertragsverständnis. In: Désirée H. Ladwig et al. (Hrsg.): Exit matters – Auf dem Weg in die Projektgesellschaft. Lang, Frankfurt am Main 2011, pp- 169–204.
- with Ralph Schuhmann: From Contract Management to Contractual Management. In: European Review of Contract Law (ERCL), 1, pp. 1–21 (2015)
- with Björn Heinze, Gerrit Tamm und Ralph Schuhmann: Internetrecht im E-Commerce. Springer, Berlin 2016
- with Ralph Schuhmann: Reconsidering Contract Risk and Contractual Risk Management. International Journal of Law and Management, vol. 59, no. 4, pp. 504–521 (2017)
- with Ralph Schuhmann: Contractual Management: Managing through Contracts, Springer Viehweg, Wiesbaden (2019)

== General references ==
- Literature from and about Bert Eichhorn from the Deutsche Nationalbibliothek.
- with Paul J. J. Welfens und Peter Palinkas (Hrsg.) Euro – neues Geld für Europa-Argumente und Fakten zur Europäischen Währungsunion von A bis Z. Campus, Frankfurt am Main 1998.
- Internet-Rechtsfragen. In: Martin Honecker et al. (eds.): Evangelisches Soziallexikon. Stuttgart 2001.
- Schutz der Leistung im Internet aus urheber- und wettbewerbsrechtlicher Sicht. in: Nicolas P. Sokianos (eds.): Produkt- und Konzeptpiraterie: erkennen, vorbeugen, abwehren, nutzen, dulden. Gabler, Wiesbaden 2006, pp. 129–148
