= Zdzisław Józef Porosiński =

Polish mathematician

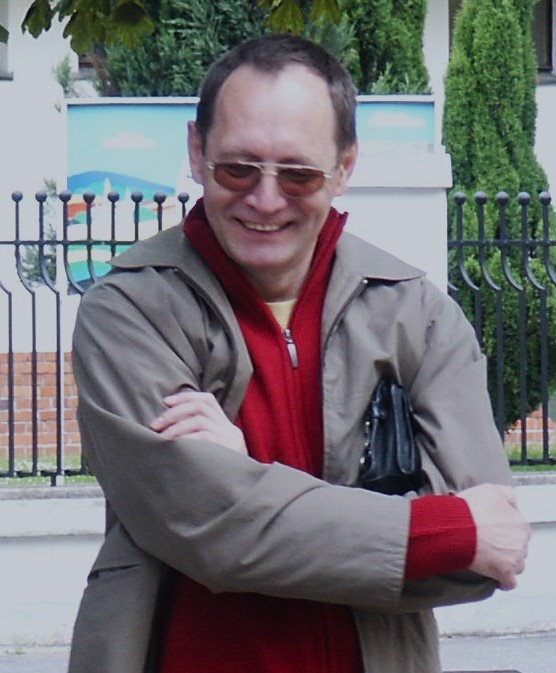
- Porosiński in 2006
- Born: 19 March 1955; Kłodzko, Poland
- Died: 26 March 2016 (aged 61); Wrocław, Poland
- Education: Wrocław University of Technology
- Known for: sequential analysis estimation game theory
- Scientific career
- Fields: Mathematics, statistics, game theory
- Workplaces: Wrocław University of Technology
- Thesis: Selected problems of optimal stopping (1987)
- Doctoral advisor: Stanisław Trybuła
- Doctoral students: Agnieszka Kamińska

Zdzisław Józef Porosiński (19 March 1955 in Kłodzko, Poland – 19 March 2016 in Wrocław, Poland) was a Polish mathematician and statistician.

== Biography ==
In 1979, he graduated in mathematics from Faculty of Fundamental Problems of Technology, Wrocław University of Technology with a master's degree. After graduation, he started working at his alma mater at the Institute of Mathematics (later renamed Institute of Mathematics and Informatics of the Wrocław University of Technology, and from 2015 transformed into the Faculty of Pure and Applied Mathematics). On 17 March 1987, he defended his doctoral dissertation entitled Selected problems of optimal stopping . The research supervisor and thesis supervisor was professor Stanisław Trybuła. On 20 November 2003, the habilitation colloquium was held. On 31 May 2004, he obtained a postdoctoral degree in mathematical sciences. In the years 2001–2008 he worked at the Institute of Basic Sciences State Higher Vocational School in Nysa. In the years 2006–2012 he was the deputy director for didactics at Institute of Mathematics and Computer Science of the Wrocław University of Technology. From 2009 he was a professor Wrocław University of Technology.

== Contributions ==
His research contributions include over 40 papers. His work in probability theory included work on optimal stopping of the sequences of random variables and the statistics of stochastic processes. The most cited results concern the optimal strategies for the optimal stopping problem when the decision horizon is random. He was the doctoral advisor of one student.
