= Barbara Rokowska =

Polish mathematician (1926–2012)

- Born: 15 April 1926; Toroszówce n. Krosno
- Died: 1 June 2012 (aged 85); Wrocław, Poland
- Education: Wrocław University
- Known for: Construction of non-isomorfic Steiner systems
- Scientific career
- Fields: Mathematics
- Workplaces: Ossolineum; Wrocław University of Technology
- Doctoral advisor: Czesław Ryll-Nardzewski

Barbara Rokowska (1926–2012) was a Polish mathematician known for her work on Steiner systems and certain problems posed by Paul Erdős. She was a professor at Wrocław University of Science and Technology.

Rokowska received an undergraduate degree in Polish from the University of Wrocław in 1951. She later began a second degree program at the University of Wrocław in mathematics. While pursuing her studies, she worked as a technical editor for mathematics journals including Colloquium Mathematicum. That journal received a submission from Erdős involving an estimate of a certain integral depending on k parameters. Though interesting, the submission was hastily written and incomplete. Rokowska's master's thesis filled in the details of Erdős' work. One of her first papers, written in collaboration with Andrzej Schinzel, treated a number theory problem also posed by Erdős.

Rokowska received her PhD, on Steiner systems, in 1966. Her doctoral advisor was Czesław Ryll-Nardzewski. She had 5 PhD students of her own.

She is buried at the Osobowicki Cemetery in Wrocław [section 134, row 6, grave 192].
