= Dionizy Smoleński =

Dionizy Smoleński (October 6, 1902 in Łódź – February 8, 1984 in Warsaw) was a specialist in the theory of combustion, explosives, and internal ballistics.

Smoleński was professor at the Wrocław and the Warsaw University of Technology. He was also rector of those universities, in 1951–1960 and 1965–1969, respectively. Smoleński was a member of Polish Academy of Sciences, and held the post of scientific secretary, then vice-chairman of this organization. During the Nazi German-occupied Poland, he was an officer of the Home Army, vice-chief of arming of the Supreme Command of the Home Army. He was also a member of Sejm of the Polish People's Republic in years 1957–1961 and in again during 1969–1972.

In 1961, Wrocław University of Technology conferred Smoleński with its first honorary doctorate.
