= Alexander J. Wulf =

Professor of business law

Alexander Johannes Wulf is a professor of business law at the SRH Hochschule Berlin, visiting researcher at the University of Kyōto, and lecturer at the Bucerius Law School.

== Academic development ==
He was a visiting scholar at the University of California, Berkeley (2018), West Bengal National University of Juridical Sciences (2016) and the University of Oxford (2011). From 2003 to 2008, he studied research methods, business and law at various universities, including the London School of Economics, the WHU – Otto Beisheim School of Management, Bucerius Law School and the SRH Hochschule Berlin. In 2013, he obtained a doctorate in law at Bucerius Law School with a thesis on institutional competition in European contract law. In 2018, he obtained a second doctorate, in the field of economics, at the University of Siegen with a thesis on the role of business law for the development of the economy.

== Research activities ==
He has received research grants from several organisations such as the German Research Foundation, the German Federal Environmental Foundation, the Indian Global Initiative of Academic Networks, the Nuffield Foundation, and others. Alexander J. Wulf conducts research in the fields of empirical legal studies and the economic analysis of law, focusing especially on issues in the fields of European law, business law and IT law. He has received several awards and prizes for his research and teaching work.

== Selected publications ==
- Wulf, A. J., Brauchen Innovationen Schutzrechte? Eine Untersuchung am Beispiel der Modeindustrie. Berlin 2006, ISBN 3-8325-1370-1.
- Wulf, A. J., Institutional competition between optional codes in European contract law. A theoretical and empirical analysis. Wiesbaden 2014, ISBN 3-658-05800-5.
- Wulf, A. J., Bedeutung des Wirtschaftsrechts für die volkswirtschaftliche Entwicklung. Perspektiven der ökonomischen Analyse. Wiesbaden 2018, ISBN 3-658-22033-3.
- Seizov, O., Wulf, A. J., & Luzak, J., The transparent trap: A multidisciplinary perspective on the design of transparent online disclosures in the EU. Journal of Consumer Policy, 42, 2019 (1), 149–173.
- Voigt, S. & Wulf, A. J., What Makes Prosecutors Independent? Analyzing the Determinants of the Independence of Prosecutors, Journal of Institutional Economics, forthcoming.
- Babaoglu, B. & Wulf, A. J., Decriminalizing the Issuance of Bad Checks in Turkey. An Analysis of the Effects of Changes in Penalties, European Journal of Law and Economics, 42, 2016 (1), 5-23.
- Wulf, A. J., Rechtskompetenz als Teil unternehmerischer Führungsqualität. Reformvorschläge für ein Studium des Rechts in den Wirtschaftswissenschaften, Zeitschrift für Didaktik der Rechtswissenschaft, 2, 2015 (1), 20–40.
- Schäfer, H.-B. & Wulf, A. J., Jurists, Clerics and Merchants. The Rise of Learned Law in Medieval Europe and its Impact on Economic Growth, Journal of Empirical Legal Studies, 11, 2014 (2), 266–300.
- Wulf, A. J., Institutional Competition of Optional Codes in European Contract Law, European Journal of Law and Economics, 38, 2014 (1), 139–162.
