= Neisse University =

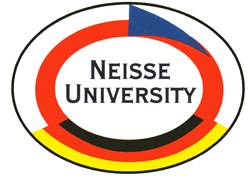
- Logo of the Neisse University
- Established: 2001
- President: Dr.-Ing. Maciej Pawlowski
- Members: approx. 75 (Jan. 2007)
- Owner: public held
- Address: Theodor-Koerner-Allee 16; 02763 Zittau
- Location: Zittau/Görlitz (Saxony/Germany); Liberec (Czech Republic); Jelenia Gora (Poland)
- Coordinates: 50°53′36″N 14°48′22″E
- Interactive map of Neisse University
- Website: www.neisse-uni.org

	Location
Students:	approx. 75 (Jan. 2007)
Courses:	1

The Neisse University was a trinational academic network held by the cooperating partners University of Applied Sciences Zittau/Görlitz, Technical University of Liberec and Wroclaw University of Technology. The places of study were located in the border triangle of Czech Republic, Poland and Germany, which are approximately 100 km apart.

== History ==
The Neisse University was established in 2001, admitting students for bachelor degrees in "Information and Communication Management", the only course offered. Its first president was Peter Schmidt.

In 2004 it was accredited by ACQUIN.

Klaus ten Hagen was elected as the new president in 2004.

From 2007 it had been possible to also immatriculate students from other than the three countries participating in the project. This was especially true of the master course which was focused on an internationally diverse student group.

In 2019, Wrocław University of Technology had to terminate its cooperation with Zittau/Görlitz University of Applied Sciences and TU Liberec. The Rector of Wrocław University of Technology informed the partner institutions in December 2019 that, due to new regulations in the Polish Higher Education Act, Wrocław University of Technology no longer sees itself in a position to continue its participation in the international Neisse University network. No new students were enrolled for the 2019/2020 semester.

== Profile of the university ==
Neisse University has had a special profile by following facts:

- lectures and seminars were held exclusively in the English language
- the site of instruction changed from Liberec in the first to Jelenia Gora in the second and then to Görlitz in the third year
- international students

== Study courses ==
- Economics and Computer Science
  - BSc. Information and Communication Management

== Faculties ==
Due to the changing sites, the courses available at the Neisse University belonged to different faculties of the partner institutes.

- Bsc Information and Communication Management
  - Faculty of Economics at the Technical University of Liberec
  - Faculty of Computer Science at the Wroclaw University of Technology
  - Faculty of Computer Science at the University of Applied Sciences Zittau/Görlitz
