= Schinzel's theorem =

Theorem about circles through lattice points

In the geometry of numbers, Schinzel's theorem is the following statement:

Schinzel's theorem—For any given positive integer $n$, there exists a circle in the Euclidean plane that passes through exactly $n$ integer points.

It was originally proved by and named after Andrzej Schinzel.

== Proof ==
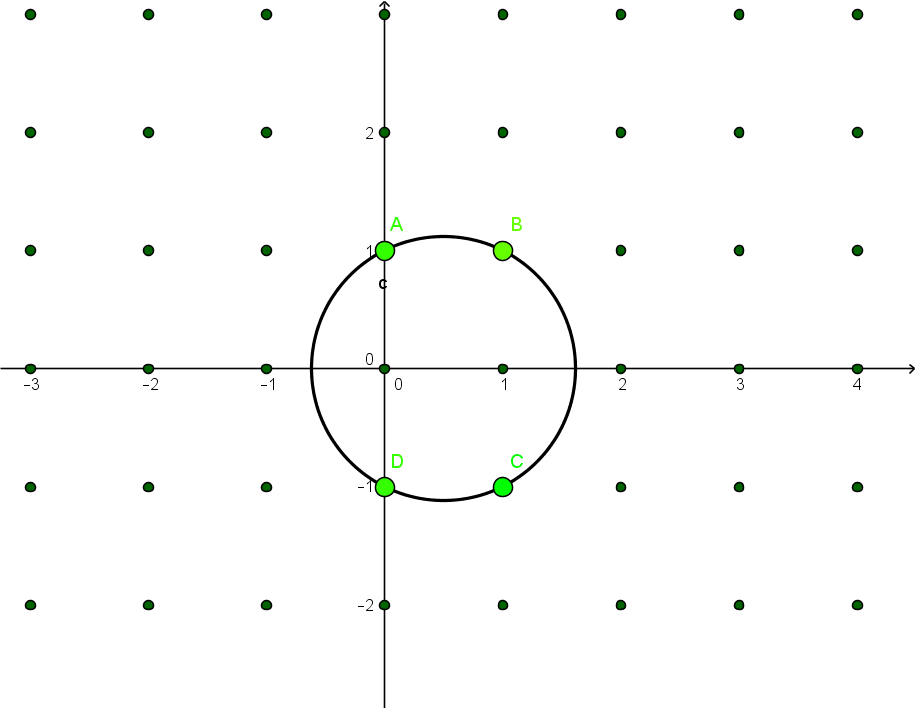
Circle through exactly four points given by Schinzel's construction

Schinzel proved this theorem by the following construction. If $n$ is an even number, with $n=2k$, then the circle given by the following equation passes through exactly $n$ points:
$$\left(x-\frac{1}{2}\right)^2 + y^2 =  \frac{1}{4} 5^{k-1}.$$
This circle has radius $5^{(k-1)/2}/2$, and is centered at the point $(\tfrac12,0)$. For instance, the figure shows a circle with radius $\sqrt 5/2$ through four integer points.

Multiplying both sides of Schinzel's equation by four produces an equivalent equation in integers,
$$\left(2x-1\right)^2 + (2y)^2 = 5^{k-1}.$$
This writes $5^{k-1}$ as a sum of two squares, where the first is odd and the second is even. There are exactly $4k$ ways to write $5^{k-1}$ as a sum of two squares, and half are in the order (odd, even) by symmetry. For example, $5^1=(\pm 1)^2 + (\pm 2)^2$, so we have $2x-1=1$ or $2x-1=-1$, and $2y=2$ or $2y=-2$, which produces the four points pictured.

On the other hand, if $n$ is odd, with $n=2k+1$, then the circle given by the following equation passes through exactly $n$ points:
$$\left(x-\frac{1}{3}\right)^2 + y^2 =  \frac{1}{9} 5^{2k}.$$
This circle has radius $5^k/3$, and is centered at the point $(\tfrac13,0)$.

== Properties ==
The circles generated by Schinzel's construction are not the smallest possible circles passing through the given number of integer points, but they have the advantage that they are described by an explicit equation.
