= Aichhorn =

Aichhorn is a German surname. Notable people with the surname include:

- August Aichhorn (1878–1949), Austrian educator and psychoanalyst
- Silke Aichhorn (born 1974), German harpist

== See also ==
- Eichhorn
