= Kazimierz Idaszewski =

Polish academic (1878 – 1965)

- Born: Kazimierz Zygmunt Idaszewski; 16 January 1878; Nochowo
- Died: 14 January 1965 (aged 86); Wrocław

Academic background
- Education: Technical University of Braunschweig
- Thesis: Versuche ueber das elektrolytische Verhalten von Schwefelkupfer (1904)

Academic work
- Discipline: Electrochemistry; Electric machinery
- Institutions: Lviv Polytechnic; Staatliche Technische Fachkurse; Silesian University of Technology; Wrocław University of Science and Technology

Kazimierz Zygmunt Idaszewski (16 January 1878 – 14 January 1965) was a Polish electrical engineer and academic. The first Polish engineer to obtain a doctorate in electrical engineering, Idaszewski spent most of his career working as a professor at Lviv Polytechnic, the Silesian University of Technology, and the Wrocław University of Science and Technology.

== Biography ==
Idaszewski was born in Nochowo, the son of Michał, an elementary school teacher, and Natalia Idaszewski (née Kuźmickica). He completed his gymnasium education at Śrem, obtaining his matura in 1898. Between 1898 and 1903, he studied at the Technical University of Braunschweig. He received a diploma in electrical engineering with distinction on 16 January 1903, after which he worked as an assistant for Roman Dzieślewski at Lviv Polytechnic between 1 October 1903 and 1904. On 25 June 1904, he received a doctorate in electrical engineering after defending his thesis Versuche ueber das elektrolytische Verhalten von Schwefelkupfer, becoming the first Polish engineer to obtain such a degree.

Beginning in September 1904, Idaszewski began to work for Siemens-Schuckert in Berlin; he would primarily research direct current electric machinery, obtaining two patents in Germany in 1909 and 1915. Idaszewski worked at Siemens-Schuckert for 15 years until 31 October 1919, after which he returned to Poland to assist the country with his knowledge. On 1 January 1920, he was nominated as associate professor of electrical measurement at Lviv Polytechnic, also becoming head of its Department of Electrotechnical Measurements. He became a member of the Association of Polish Electrical Engineers in 1921; he was then made ordinary professor in 1924, serving as dean of the Department of Mechanics in the 1926–27 school year. In 1930, he became head of the Department of Electrical Machinery at Lviv Polytechnic. He was elected as a councilor in the 13th district of the Lviv City Council in May 1939.

After Lviv Polytechnic was closed during the German occupation of Lviv, Idaszewski first taught at a craft school and then became head of the Department of Electrical Machinery and Measurement at the Państwowych Technicznych Kursów Fachowych. When Soviet troops began to head for Lviv in 1944, Idaszewski left for Kraków, becoming dean of the Faculty of Electronics at the Silesian University of Technology in May 1945. He then became dean of the Faculty of Mechanics and Electrical Engineering at the Wrocław University of Science and Technology in October 1945, where after several weeks of planning he held the first post-war academic lecture at the University (as well as Wrocław) on 15 November 1945. Resigning as dean in April 1946, Idaszewski became vice rector of the University in July 1947, where he defended the University from liquidation. In September 1949, he was appointed chairman of a committee that verified and examined electricians that were trying to obtain a professional electrical engineering degree, serving as chairman until 1954.

Idaszewski was awarded the Knight's Cross of the Order of Polonia Restituta in 1950, followed by the Commander's Cross in 1958. A member of the Warsaw Scientific Society from 1951, and an honorary member of the Polish Society of Theoretical and Applied Electrical Engineering from 1964, Idaszewski died on 14 January 1964. He was buried at a cemetery in Wrocław.
