= Stanisław Trybuła =

Polish mathematician and statistician (1932–2008)

Stanisław Czesław Trybuła Professor
- Born: 2 January 1932; Rafałówka, Poland
- Died: 7 January 2008 (aged 76); Wrocław, Poland
- Known for: Sequential analysis Estimation; Game theory
- Awards: Honored Teacher of the Polish People's Republic Commander's Cross with Star Medal of the National Education Commission

Academic background
- Education: Nicolaus Copernicus University in Toruń; Wrocław University; Institute of Mathematics of the Polish Academy of Sciences
- Doctoral advisor: Hugo Steinhaus

Academic work
- Discipline: Mathematics; Game theory Statistics
- Institutions: Wrocław University of Technology; Institute of Power Systems (IASE) in Wrocław
- Doctoral students: Ryszard Magiera; Zdzisław Józef Porosiński; Tadeusz Radzik
- Main interests: Game theory; Statistics

Stanisław Czesław Trybuła (2 January 1932 – 28 January 2008) was a Polish mathematician and statistician.

== Early life and education ==
Trybuła was a pupil of state high school in Rypin, Poland, and he graduated from The First High School in Toruń in 1950. He studied mathematics in Nicolaus Copernicus University in Toruń and Wrocław University. He defended his master thesis on some problems of the game theory prepared under supervision of Hugo Steinhaus at Wrocław University in 1955.

== Academic career ==
In 1955 Trybuła became a faculty member at Department of Mathematics, Wrocław University of Technology. In 1959 he was distinguished as the candidate of science and in 1960 he defended his PhD on minimax estimation under supervision of Hugo Steinhaus. For many years he collaborated with or was on the staff of Institute of Power Systems (IASE) in Wrocław. He worked out the original method of identification of the complex power systems. Since 1968 he was faculty member of the Institute of Mathematics, Faculty of Fundamental Problems of Technology, Wrocław University of Technology. Trybuła got habilitation at Faculty of Mathematics, Physics and Chemistry, Wrocław University in 1968 based on his seminal works on sequential analysis for stochastic processes. In 1973, he became an associate professor, and in 1988, a full professor of mathematical sciences.

== Contributions ==
Trybuła was the advisor of 14 PhD theses. He published 102 works independently and 38 co-authored ones He took early retirement in 1998 and was writing academic books on statistics and the game theory.

He is the co-author of the WJ bidding system in the bridge, known also as Polish Club (see also, following Stayman convention, Trybula transfers, Wesolowski texas, Gawrys fourth suit forcing).
