= SRH Hochschule Berlin =

Private university in Germany

SRH Berlin University of Applied Sciences
- SRH Berlin University of Applied Sciences
- Type: Private
- Established: 2002
- President: Victoria Büsch
- Students: 2200
- Location: Berlin, Germany; 52.4756426°N 13.4574816°E
- Campus: Berlin, Dresden and Hamburg
- Website: www.srh-berlin.de

SRH Berlin University of Applied Sciences (formerly known as OTA Hochschule) is a private university in Berlin which is part of SRH Holding. The university of applied sciences was founded in 2002. The introduction of English-speaking academic programmes at Bachelor's and Master's level began in 2006. SRH Berlin University of Applied Sciences offers Bachelor's, Master's and MBA programmes in German and English. The university of applied sciences is characterised by its international orientation and student body and the various collaborations with partner universities around the globe. There are currently more than 2200 students enrolled at the private university.

== Past and present presidents ==
Rita Süssmuth, former Federal Minister (1985–1988), President of the German Bundestag (1988–1998) and known for her international comparative educational research, migration and integration, was President of SRH Berlin University of Applied Sciences from 2005 - 2010. In 2010 Peter Eichhorn became president and held the office until 2014. He was succeeded in October 2014 by the current President of SRH Berlin University of Applied Sciences, Victoria Büsch.

== SRH Holding ==
OTA University changed its name, joining the SRH group in 2007 together with five other universities SRH Holding is a non-profit organisation in healthcare and education. In 2016 SRH Holding consisted of 10 universities and universities of applied sciences.

== Programmes ==
SRH Berlin University of Applied Sciences offers German and English Bachelor's, Master's and MBA programmes with management and technology foci. The 15 English-taught programmes are:

- International Business Administration (B.A.)
- Business Information Systems (B.Sc.)
- Global Hospitality Management (B.A.)
- International Management (M.A.)
- International Management - Focus on Creative Management (M.A.)
- Entrepreneurship (M.A.)
- Engineering and International Business - Focus on Renewable Energy, Water and Waste Management (M.Eng.)
- Engineering and Sustainable Technology Management - Focus on Mobility and Automotive Management (M.Eng.)
- Engineering and Sustainable Technology Management - Focus on Digital Industry (M.Eng.)
- Engineering and Sustainable Technology Management - Focus on Digital Building Infrastructure (M.Eng.)
- Software Engineering (M.Sc.)
- Computer Science - Focus on Cyber Security (M.Sc.)
- Computer Science - Focus on Big Data and Artificial Intelligence (M.Sc.)
- International Business and Leadership (M.A.)
- Hospitality Management and Leadership (M.A.)
- General Management (MBA)
- International Healthcare Management (MBA)
- International MBA Program (MBA)
- Digital Supply chain Management (M.Sc.)

== Professors ==
- Bert Eichhorn
- Michael Hartmann
- Dieter Kronzucker
- Alexander J. Wulf
