= Jan Paweł Nowacki =

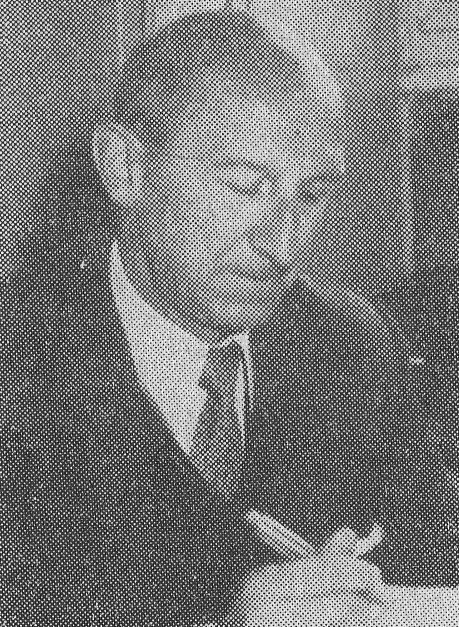
Jan Paweł Nowacki

Jan Paweł Nowacki (25 June 1905, in Berlin – 23 May 1979, in Warsaw) was an engineer. He worked for the British during World War II on radar installations, and later had a career as a university lecturer.

== Biography ==
He attended secondary school in Berlin. From 1919 he lived in Poznań, where he received his high school diploma. He graduated in 1929 in Lwów with a degree in electrical engineering. In 1928 he was appointed assistant professor to Kazimierz Idaszewski. He earned his PhD in 1937. At the same time he directed various technical projects, such as the electrification of the Warsaw railway junction.

In 1940 he went to France and later to England. He has considerable achievements in development of radar equipment for the British military aviation. He was also a colonel of Royal Air Force authorized to military top secrets.

In 1947 he went to Wrocław to replace Professor Kazimierz Idaszewski in the position of Head of the Department of Electrical Machines. He inspired his colleagues and students to create a School of Electrical Engineering Science. In 1953 he moved permanently to Warsaw, to lead the Chair of Theoretical Electrical Engineering, and later the Department of Nuclear Energy. At the same time he worked in the automation field, and in biocybernetic issues.

The Royal Swedish Academy of Engineering Sciences appointed him as member in 1961. He was also a member of the Polish Academy of Sciences.
