= Elizabeth Eichhorn =

Argentine sculptor (born 1957)

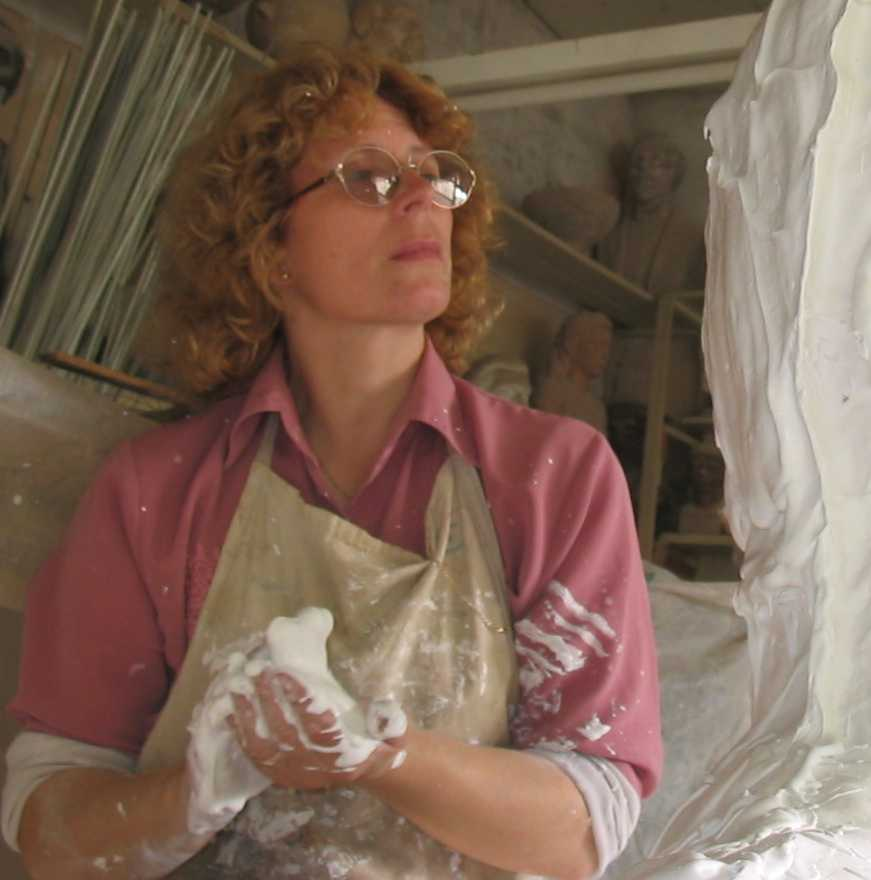
- Elizabeth Eichhorn working on the monument to Francisco "Pancho" Ramirez
- Born: 1957 (age 67–68); Junín, Buenos Aires Province, Argentina
- Known for: Sculpture; Drafting

Elizabeth Eichhorn (born 1957, Junín, Buenos Aires Province) is an Argentine sculptor and draftsman. She has lived in Mar del Plata from an early age. Eichhorn is a descendant of Volga Germans; her grandparents, Wilhelm and Elisabeth Eichhorn Herbel, were part of the oldest wolgadeutschen colony in the country. She is the daughter of William Eichhorn and Mary Esther Lerena. Her works depict humans in various forms and expressions, dealing with racial and social customs and messages. Human geography is an inexhaustible source of inspiration for her new works. Topics have included maternity, children, ethnic characters, allegories on the future, child exploitation, the seasons, aging and historical issues. Eichhorn is Professor of Visual Arts and Technical Pottery (2011).
