= Wrocław University of Science and Technology =

Technical university in Wrocław, Poland

- Politechnika Wrocławska
- Latin: Polytechnica Wratislaviensis
- Type: Public
- Established: 1945
- Affiliations: EUA (European University Association), TIME (Top Industrial Managers for Europe), CRE (Association of European Universities CRE-Columbus), EAIE, PACE (Partners for the Advancement of Collaborative Engineering Education)
- Budget: PLN 613 million (2012)
- Rector: Arkadiusz Wójs
- Faculty: 2,131
- Students: 20,970 (12.2023)
- Doctoral students: 918
- Location: Wrocław, Poland; 51.107°N 17.062°E
- Campus: Urban
- Colors
- Website: https://pwr.edu.pl/en/

University rankings

Global – Overall
- CWTS World: 576 (2022)
- QS World: 292nd in Engineering & Technology

Regional – Overall
- QS Emerging Europe and Central Asia: 45 (2022)

Wrocław University of Science and Technology (Polish: Politechnika Wrocławska) is a technological university in Wrocław, Poland. With buildings and infrastructures dispersed throughout the city, its main facilities are gathered at a central location near Plac Grunwaldzki, alongside the Oder river. It operates three regional branches in Jelenia Góra, Legnica, and Wałbrzych. Huffington Post UK named Wrocław University of Science and Technology in the top 15 of the World’s Most Beautiful Universities Rankings.

== Students and staff ==
As of May 2020, the university educates almost 26,000 students in over 50 Bachelor, Master, and PhD programs. Every year over 4,000 degrees are conferred with over 80,000 graduates since its foundation. The university staff consists of over 2,000 academic employees and another 2,000 administration workers.

== Rankings ==
In 2021, Wrocław University of Science and Technology was among the best universities in the world - according to The Academic Ranking of World Universities (ARWU), i.e. the Shanghai ranking. The university was classified in the 901–1000 band, at the same time taking third place among Polish technical universities. Three areas are included in the Global Ranking of Academic Subjects 2021 among the fields of science that are conducted at Wrocław University of Science and Technology. Mathematics was classified in places 201–300, and energy (Energy Science and Engineering) and Mechanical Engineering in places 301-400.

In the prestigious QS World University Rankings by Subject 2021, Wrocław University of Science and Technology has been classified in seven scientific fields: Material Sciences (places between 301–350), Engineering-Mechanical (places between 301–350), Engineering-Electrical and Electronic (places between 351–400), Mathematics (places range 351–400), Chemistry (places range 401–450), Physics & Astronomy (places range 501–550, Computer Sciences and Information Systems (places range 501–550).

In the Regional Rankings Emerging Europe and Central Asia 2020 as part of the QS World University Rankings, in which universities in Eastern, Central and Central Asia are classified, Wrocław University of Science and Technology was ranked 43rd, and among national universities - 4th.

In the most important Polish ranking of universities, "Perspektywy", Wrocław University of Science and Technology took 3rd place among technical universities in 2021 and 6th place among all academic universities in Poland.

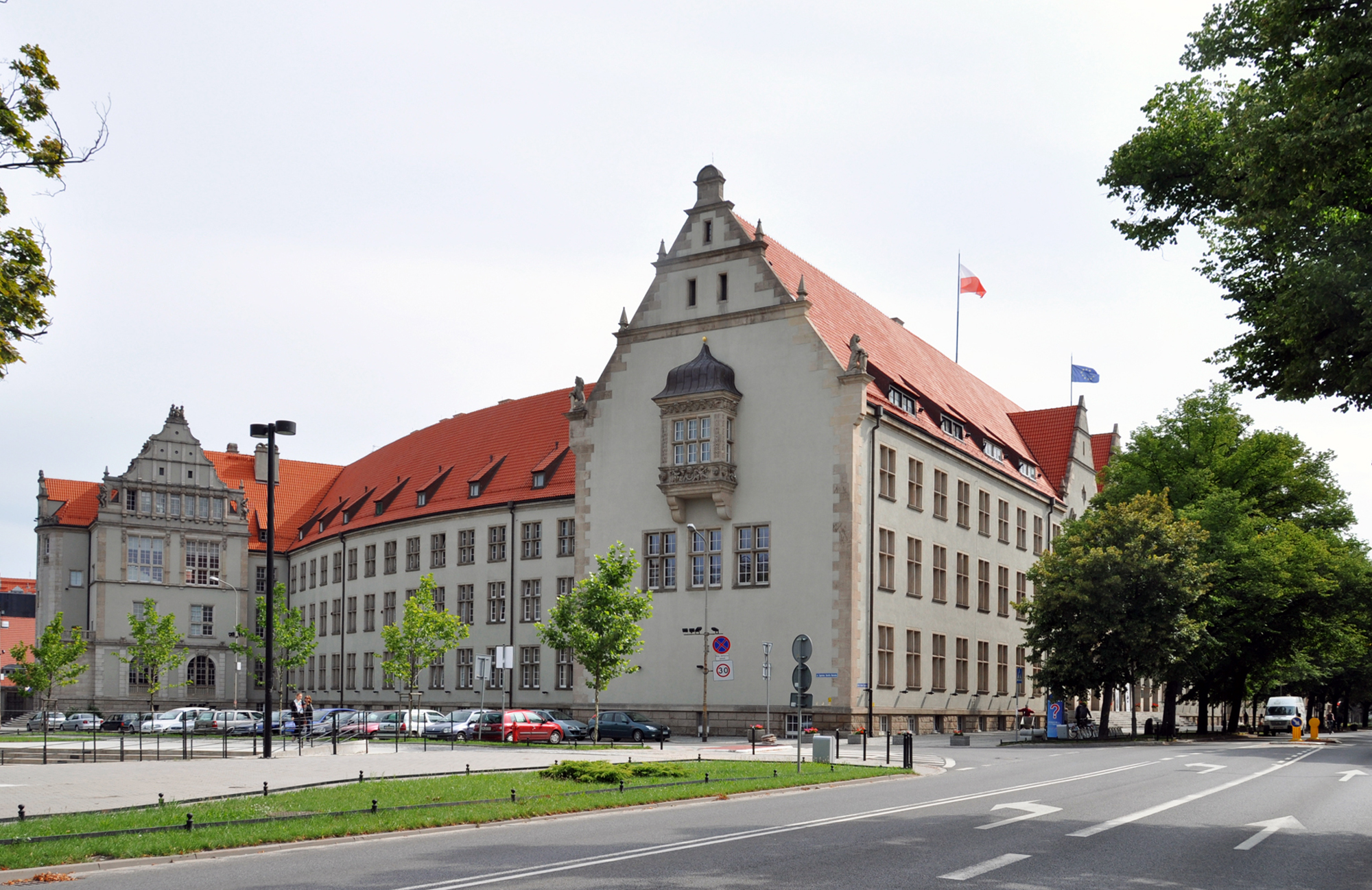
Main Building

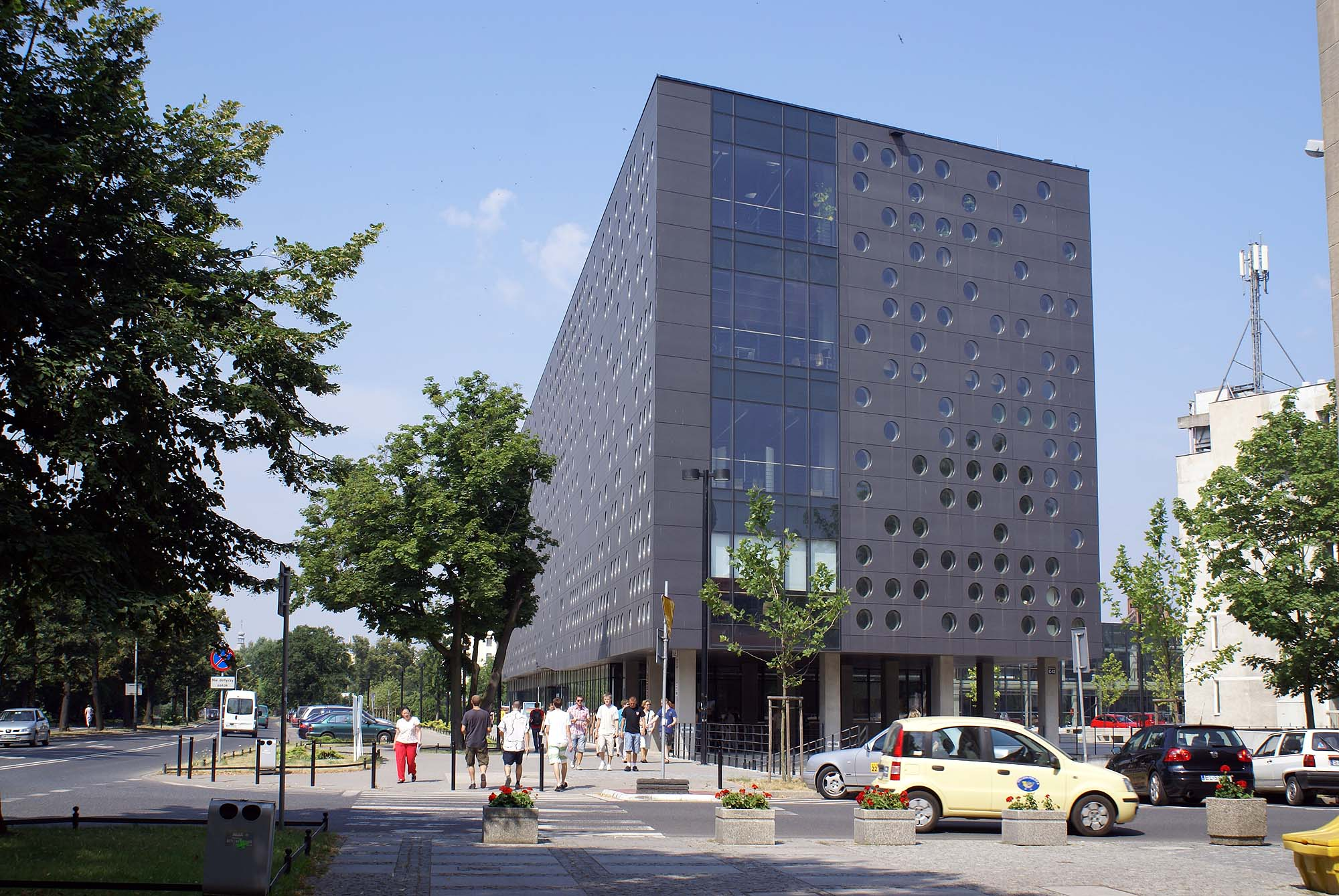
C13 Building.

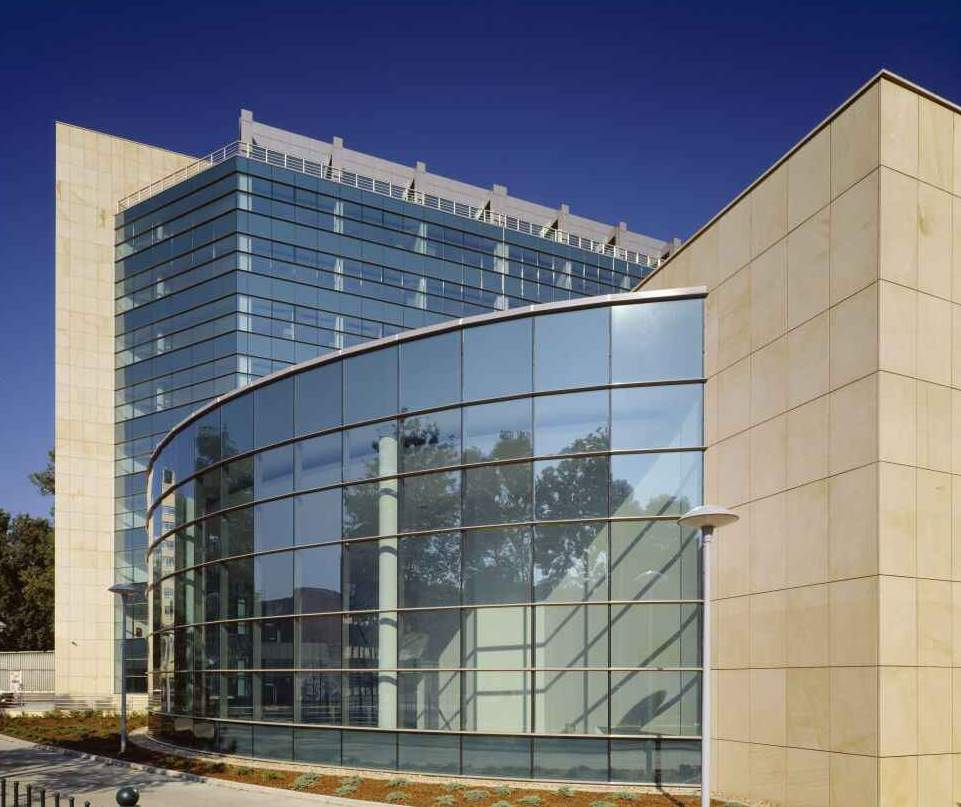
D20 Building - Faculty of Electrical Engineering.

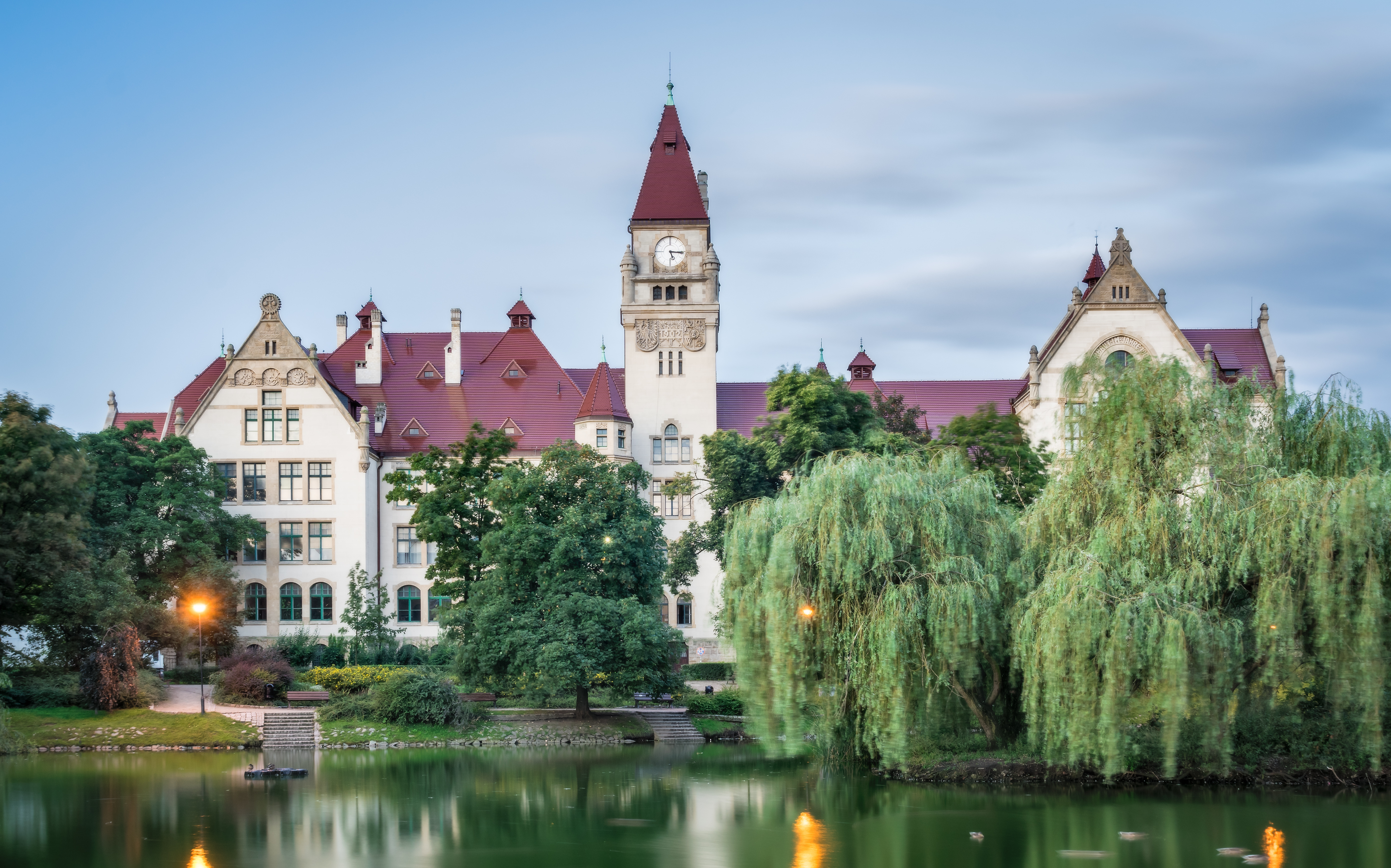
E1 Building - Faculty of Architecture.

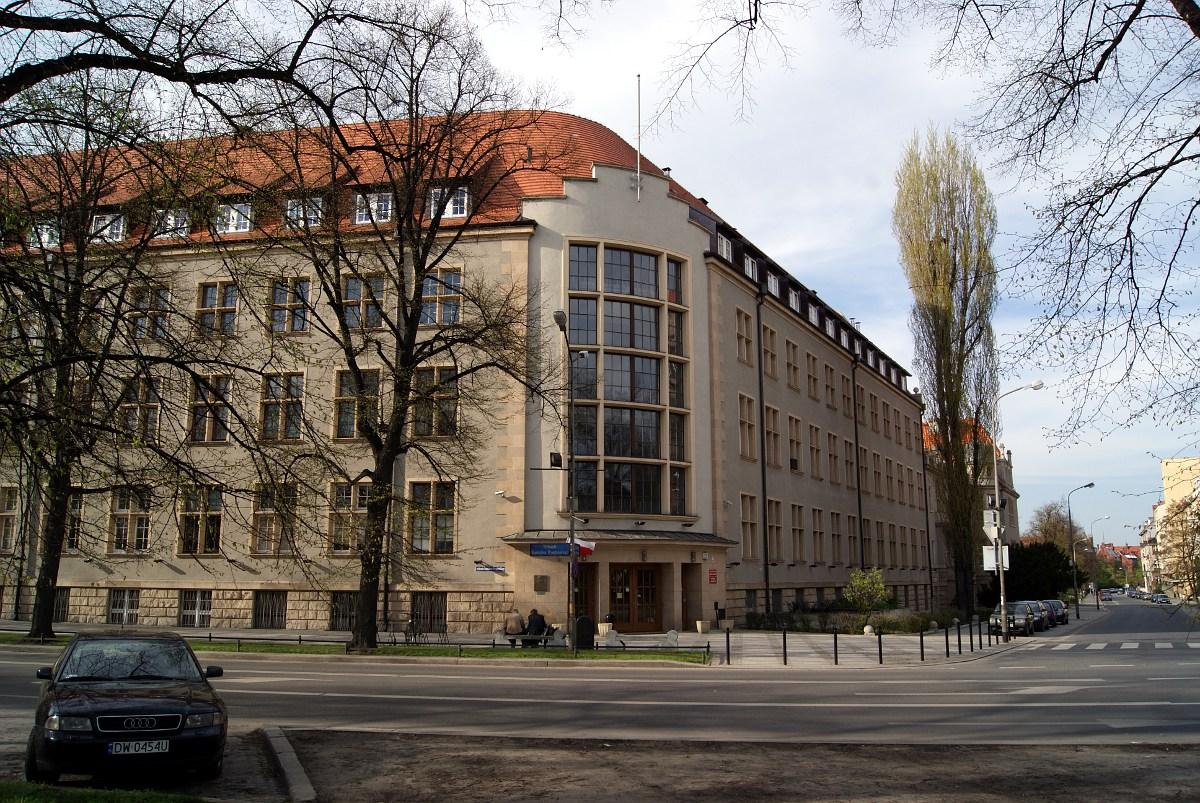
A2 Building - Faculty of Chemistry.

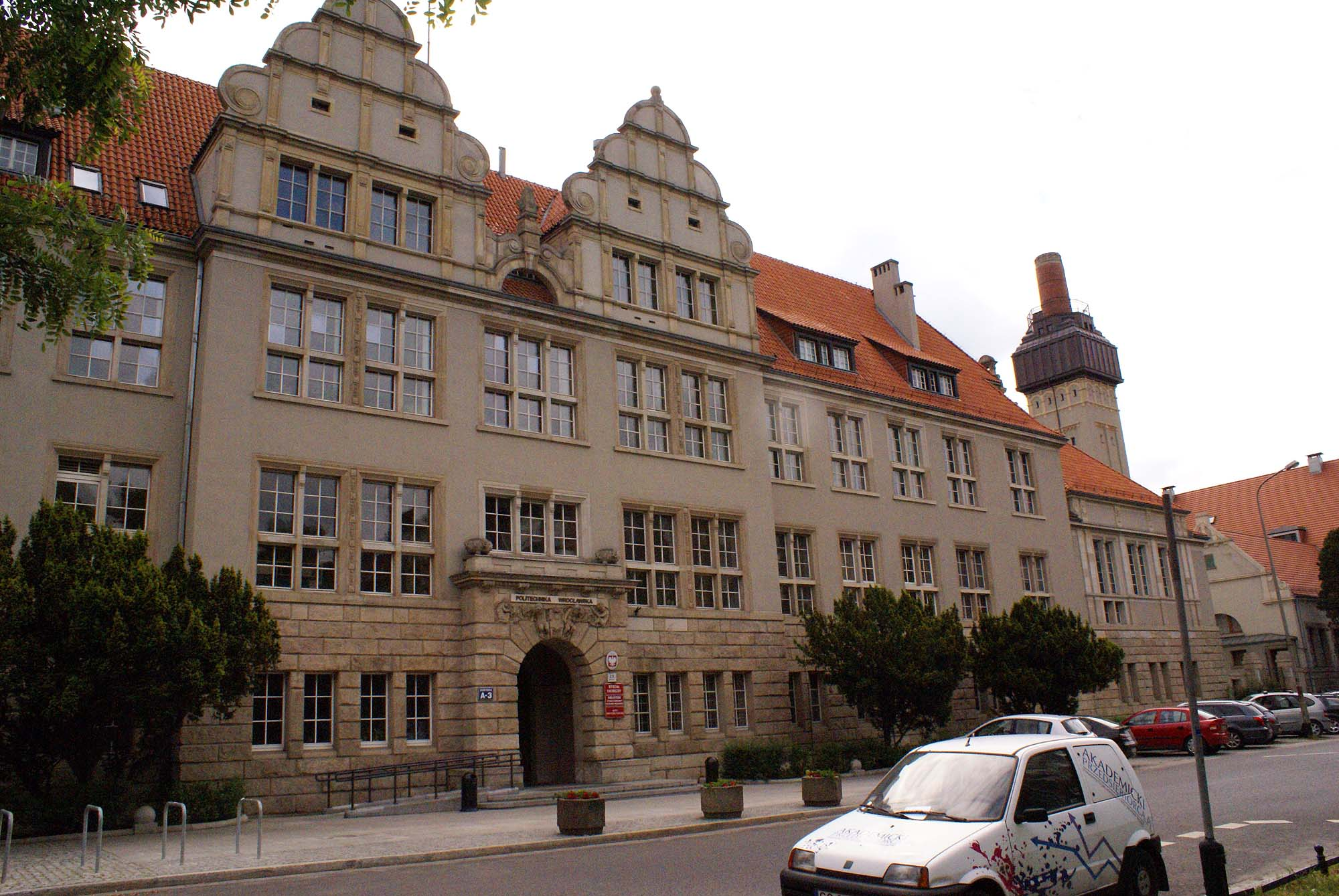
Faculty of Mechanics.

== History ==
The Polish Wrocław University of Technology was founded on 24 August 1945. A group of 27 professors, originating from the University and Technical University of Lwów, arrived in Wrocław and started the Polish academic society in the destroyed or severely damaged buildings of the Technische Hochschule Breslau. The first lecture was given by Kazimierz Idaszewski on 15 November 1945. Since then that day has been celebrated as Wrocław Science Day.

In 1951 the university was divided into two institutions. The first rector of the newly established Wrocław University of Technology was Dionizy Smoleński. From this moment, the polytechnic developed quickly and underwent numerous organisational changes.

Nowadays students of this university take part in several science programmes such as SSETI Program – developing communication systems and steering for a satellite launched 5 October 2005.

The university is one of the founders of the International University of Logistics and Transport in Wrocław, with the city of Wrocław and the French university École supérieure internationale de commerce in Metz.

== Campus ==
The university is situated across several campuses. The primary campus is located near Grunwald Square, adjacent to the Oder River. Additional campuses are located east of the main campus, near Braci Gierymskich Street, Chelmonskiego Street, and Wittiga Street (informally known as "Teki" or "Wittigowo"), where four dormitories are situated. To the north is the Prusa Street campus, and to the northwest is the campus near Dluga Street. The university offers over 2,500 dormitory places across four locations in Wrocław, with a total of nine dormitories.

The university also maintains three regional branches in Jelenia Góra, Legnica, and Wałbrzych.

Overall it comprises 116 buildings equipped for research and teaching purposes.

=== Polinka Cable Car ===
The Polinka cable car, launched on October 1, 2013, connects the Main University Campus with the Na Grobli Campus across the Oder River. It operates with two carriages, each accommodating up to 15 passengers (10 seated and 5 standing), and completes the journey in under three minutes.

== Organization ==
Wrocław University of Science and Technology is managed by a rector and seven vice-rectors. Rectors and vice-rectors, as well as deans and directors of the departments are elected by the staff. The highest governing body within the university is the Senate, which consists of 60 members: rector, 32 representatives of academic teachers employed as professors or university professors, 12 representatives of academic teachers employed in positions other than professor or university professor, 3 representatives of non-academic employees, 12 representatives of students and doctoral students.

=== Faculties ===
As of 2025, Wrocław University of Science and Technology is organized into 14 faculties, and 79 departments and institutes:

- Faculty of Architecture
- Faculty of Civil Engineering
- Faculty of Chemistry
- Faculty of Information and Communication Technology
- Faculty of Electrical Engineering
- Faculty of Geoengineering, Mining and Geology
- Faculty of Environmental Engineering
- Faculty of Management
- Faculty of Mechanical and Power Engineering
- Faculty of Mechanical Engineering
- Faculty of Fundamental Problems of Technology
- Faculty of Electronics, Photonics and Microsystems
- Faculty of Pure and Applied Mathematics
- Faculty of Medicine

== Research ==
At Wrocław University of Science and Technology research is carried out in 14 disciplines within four scientific fields: engineering and technical, sciences and natural sciences, medical and health sciences, and social sciences.

- Architecture and urban planning
- Automation, electronics, electrical engineering and space technology
- Technical informatics and telecommunications
- Biomedical engineering
- Chemical engineering
- Civil engineering, surveying and transportation
- Materials engineering
- Mechanical engineering
- Environmental, mining and energy engineering
- Mathematics
- Chemical sciences
- Physical sciences
- Medical sciences
- Management and quality sciences

The university has 581 educational laboratories, 407 research laboratories, and 8 accredited laboratories.

6,279 registered inventions, including utility models. 24,847 publications in journals on the ISI Master Journal List. 22,9895 publications in JCRI indexed journals.

== Scientific Journals ==
Active journals:

- Acta of Bioengineering and Biomechanics (e-ISSN: 2450-6303)
- Architectus (e-ISSN: 2084-5227)
- e-Informatica Software Engineering Journal (e-ISSN: 2084-4840)
- Environment Protection Engineering (e-ISSN: 2450-260X)
- Journal of TransLogistics (e-ISSN: 2956-5375)
- Materials Science-Poland (e-ISSN: 2083-134X)
- Operations Research and Decisions (e-ISSN: 2391-6060)
- Optica Applicata (e-ISSN: 1899-7015)
- Physicochemical Problems of Mineral Processing (e-ISSN: 2084-4735)

== Rectors ==
1. Stanisław Kulczyński (1945–1951)
2. Dionizy Smoleński (1951–1960)
3. Zygmunt Szparkowski (1960–1969)
4. Tadeusz Porębski (1969–1980)
5. Bogusław Kędzia (1 XII 1980–31 VIII 1981)
6. Tadeusz Zipser (1 IX–29 XII 1981)
7. Jerzy Schroeder (6 I–31 VII 1982)
8. Wacław Kasprzak (1982–1984)
9. Jan Kmita (1984–1990)
10. Andrzej Wiszniewski (1990–1996)
11. Andrzej Mulak (1996–2002)
12. Tadeusz Luty (2002–2008)
13. Tadeusz Więckowski (2008–2016)
14. Cezary Madryas (2016–2020)
15. Arkadiusz Wójs (2020–)

== Student life ==
Students have their own self-government, which controls most of their affairs. At the university works also the Career Office which helps students in transition process from education to work.

There are reportedly 214 student science groups, 29 student organizations, and 21 student culture agencies, including chapters of AIESEC, Erasmus Student Network, International Association for the Exchange of Students for Technical Experience, and the Independent Students' Association.

== European cooperation networks ==
- Neisse University: 2001, in cooperation with the Technical University of Liberec in Czech Republic and the University of Applied Sciences Zittau/Goerlitz in Germany, the Neisse University was established. The academic network provides own study courses using the resources of the partner institutes. In that way students study in three countries and acquire intercultural and interdisciplinary knowledge and experiences.
- Top Industrial Managers for Europe: The university participate to student mobility and research cooperations with European technology universities through the Top Industrial Managers for Europe (TIME) network.
- Unite!: An alliance of nine European universities focused on advancing innovation, sustainability, and cross-border collaboration in research, technology, and education. It facilitates international exchange, co-creation, and lifelong learning.

== International cooperation ==
Wrocław University of Science and Technology is a participant in the Erasmus+, Erasmus Mundus Joint Master (EMJM), and Central European Exchange Program for University Studies (CEEPUS) programs. In addition to these programs, WUST has established partnerships and exchange agreements with numerous universities worldwide. Partners include:

- Europe: University of Liège, Czech Technical University in Prague, University of Strasbourg, National Technical University of Athens, University of Twente, Vilnius Gediminas Technical University, TU Dresden, Technical University of Munich, Lviv Polytechnic, Polytechnic University of Milan
- Americas: Kansas State University, University of Michigan, University of Arizona, Toronto Metropolitan University, Polytechnique Montréal, Instituto Politécnico Nacional, Pontifical Catholic University of Paraná
- Asia: Tianjin University of Technology, Shanghai Polytechnic University, Keio University, Shibaura Institute of Technology, Tohoku University, Incheon National University, Kyungpook National University, Seoul National University of Science and Technology, National Chung Hsing University, National Taiwan University of Science and Technology, Technion – Israel Institute of Technology

== Notable faculty and alumni ==
- Bogdan Baranowski – chemist
- Krzysztof Baranowski – yachtsman, sailor
- Leszek Czarnecki – businessman, billionaire and world record holder in diving
- Rafał Dutkiewicz – former president of the City of Wrocław
- Jadwiga Grabowska-Hawrylak – architect
- Wojciech Kurtyka – climber
- Jan Paweł Nowacki – electrical engineer
- Barbara Rokowska - mathematician
- Wanda Rutkiewicz – mountaineer
- Hugo Steinhaus – mathematician
- Władysław Ślebodziński – mathematician
- Czesław Ryll-Nardzewski – mathematician
- Włodzimierz Trzebiatowski – physicist, chemist and mathematician
- Stanisław Tołpa – botanist
- Stanisław Trybuła – mathematician
- Krzysztof Wielicki – mountaineer, the fifth man to climb all fourteen eight-thousanders
- Maja Włoszczowska – World Champion in mountain biking

== See also ==
- University of Wrocław
