= Nochowo =

- Village
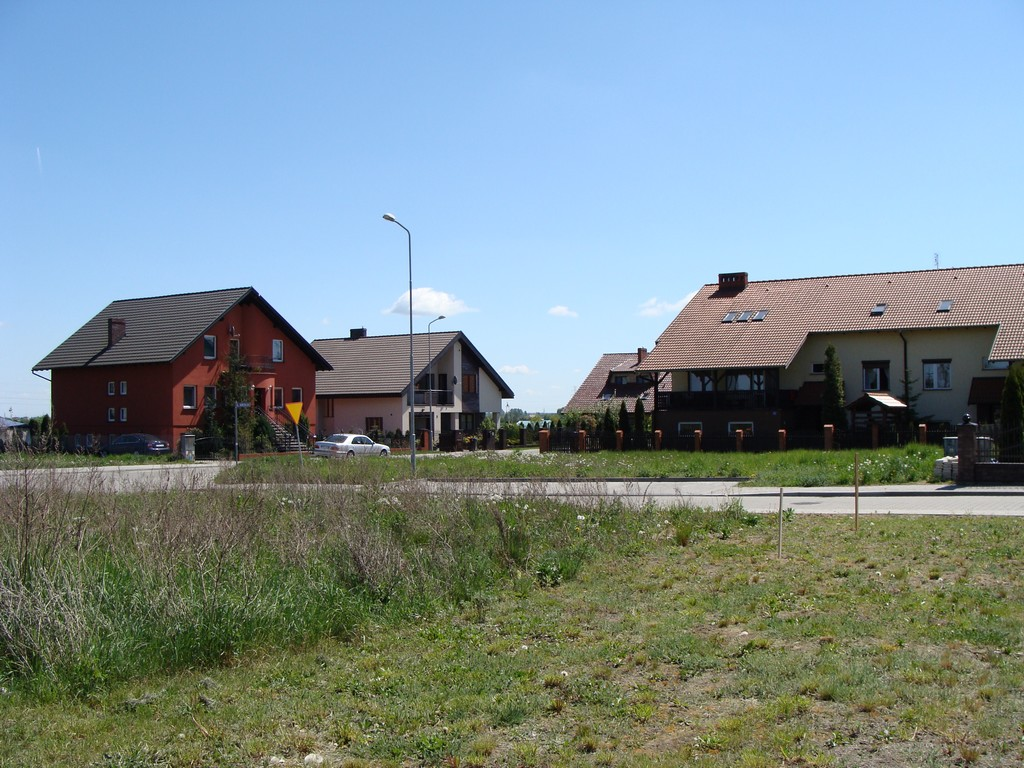
- Houses in the village in 2008

- Location within Poland
- Coordinates: 52°4′N 16°59′E
- Country: Poland
- Voivodeship: Greater Poland
- County: Śrem
- Gmina: Śrem
- Elevation: 80 m (260 ft)
- Population: 870

Nochowo [nɔˈxɔvɔ] is a village in the administrative district of Gmina Śrem, within Śrem County, Greater Poland Voivodeship, in west-central Poland.
