= Władysław Schinzel =

Polish chess player (born 1943)

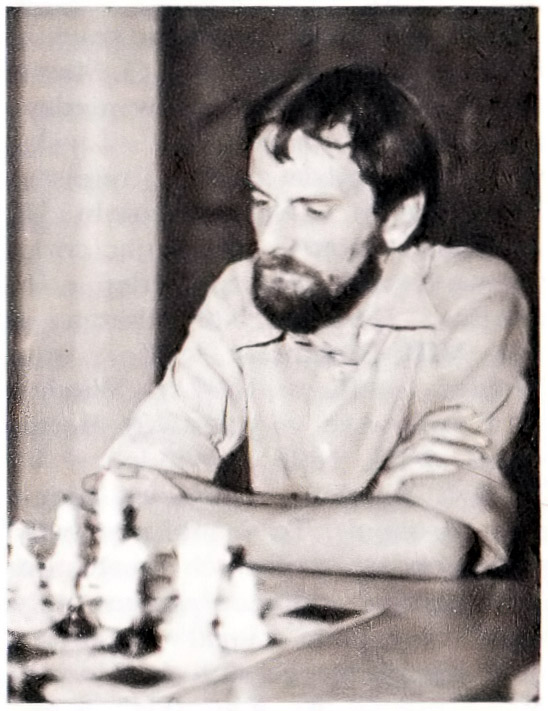

Personal information
- Born: 22 May 1943 (age 83) Warsaw, Poland

Chess career
- Country: Poland
- Title: International Master (1979)
- Peak rating: 2400 (July 1978)

Władysław Schinzel (born 22 May 1943) is a Polish chess International Master (1979).

== Chess career ==
In 1961, in Olsztyn Władysław Schinzel won Polish Junior Chess Championship for U20 age group. He participated 9 times in the finals of the Polish Chess Championships (1965, 1973–1977, 1979–1981), in which Władysław Schinzel achieved the best result in 1979, when he ranked in 5th place. In 1972, Władysław Schinzel won bronze medal in the Polish Blitz Chess Championship. In the same year, he took 4th place in the International Chess Tournament in Solin. In 1974 Władysław Schinzel was the 2nd place in Kraków, and a year later – ranked 3rd place in Rimavská Sobota. In 1976 he took 3rd place in Poznań, and in 1978 – 2nd place in Krosno and 3rd place in Warsaw. The following year Władysław Schinzel shared the 1st place in Hradec Králové. In 1981 he took 2nd place in Warsaw. In the years 1977–1981 he performed three times in Akiba Rubinstein Memorial in Polanica-Zdrój.

Władysław Schinzel reached his career highest rating on January 1, 1978, with a score of 2400 points and was then 6th -7th place (together with Franciszek Borkowski) among Polish chess players. Since 1982, he has not played in tournaments classified by FIDE.

== Private life ==
Władysław Schinzel is the younger brother of mathematician Andrzej Schinzel (1937–2021).
