= Technical University of Liberec =

University in Liberec, Czech Republic

- Technická univerzita v Liberci
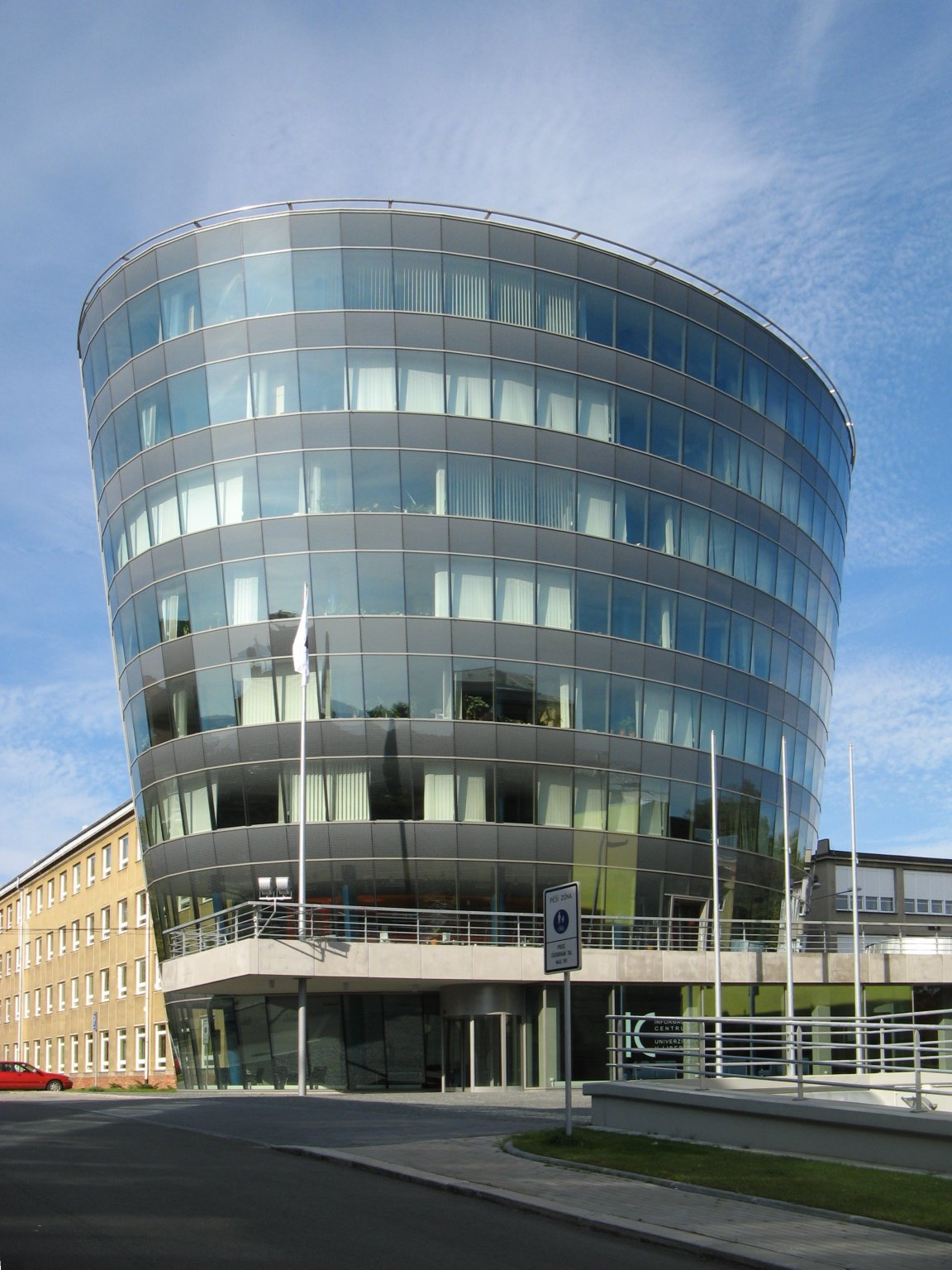
- Type: Public
- Established: 1953
- Rector: doc. RNDr. Miroslav Brzezina, CSc.
- Students: 9,000
- Location: Liberec, Czech Republic
- Website: http://www.tul.cz/en

University rankings

Regional – Overall
- QS Emerging Europe and Central Asia: 131 (2022)

The Technical University of Liberec (Czech: Technická univerzita v Liberci) is a university in the city of Liberec, Czech Republic. The university has undergone great transformation in its over sixty-year history. When it was founded, it was called the Institute of Mechanical Engineering in Liberec, and its original classrooms were located in the attics of the F. X. Šalda Grammar School. These later served as accommodation for teachers, and it was here that the first plans and ideas arose concerning the later form and direction of the college. The first 259 students were admitted on October 1, 1953.

Today, the university has seven faculties and one specialized institute:

Faculty of Mechanical Engineering, Faculty of Textile Engineering, Faculty of Science-Humanities and Education, Faculty of Economics, Faculty of Arts and Architecture, Faculty of Mechatronics, Informatics and Inter-Disciplinary Studies, Faculty of Health Studies, Institute for Nanomaterials, Advanced Technologies and Innovation

== Academics ==
The university offers courses in the humanities and sciences, as well as many technical subjects. Students can obtain bachelor's, master's, or doctoral degrees. The Technical University of Liberec is a medium-sized institution.

== Research ==
The Institute for Nanomaterials, Advanced Technologies and Innovation has been a part of the Technical University of Liberec since 2012. Its 19 specialized laboratories aim to contribute to regional development and are traditionally oriented towards technical industries. Research programmes focus on materials research, nanomaterials and engineering, emphasizing applications.

== Study ==
Technical University of Liberec offers three bachelor's, eight master's, and seven doctoral programmes taught in English.

- Bachelor in System Engineering and Informatics (Nisa/Neisse University)
- Bachelor in Textile and Fashion Design, the only one in the Czech Republic
- Bachelor in Textile Technologies, Materials and Nanomaterials, the only one in the Czech Republic
- Bachelors in Economics, Management, & Business Administration, dual degree bachelor's programme with the University of Huddersfield
- Master in Electrical Engineering and Informatics, Mechatronics
- Masters in Architecture and Urban Design
- Masters in Economics and Management, dual degree bachelor's programme with the University of Huddersfield
- Masters in Mechanical Engineering & Innovation
- Masters in Mechanical Engineering, Machines & Equipment Design
- Masters in Mechanical Engineering, Technology, and Materials
- Masters in Textile & Clothing Engineering, the only one in the Czech Republic
- Masters in Textile Engineering, Nonwoven & Nanomaterials, the only one in the Czech Republic
- PhD in Applied Mechanics
- PhD in Electrical Engineering, Informatics, & Technical Cybernetics
- PhD in Machine and Equipment Design
- PhD in Manufacturing Systems and Processes
- PhD in Material Engineering
- PhD in System Engineering, Informatics, & Economics
- PhD in Textile Engineering, Textile Techniques & Materials Engineering

Successful students of economics are eligible to participate in the dual degree bachelor's programme with the University of Huddersfield, which was named University of the Year 2013.

The Faculty of Textile Engineering is the only institution in the Czech Republic that offers a complete education program in textiles.

== Neisse University ==
Neisse University is a unique inter-regional project between three partner universities — Hochschule Zittau/Görlitz, Politechnika Wroclawska and the Technical University of Liberec. It is available to Bachelor's degree students of Information and Communication Management course at the Faculty of Economics. Students of this programme spend one year at each university, experiencing different academic and cultural environments. They graduate from this multiple-degree programme with a diploma recognised in three European countries.

== Accommodation ==
The Residence Halls of the university have been evaluated as the best ones in the Czech Republic three years in succession; they are modern, comfortable, offer high-speed internet connection, excellent sport facilities, student clubs and medical services on-site.

== Sports Center ==
Students participate in sports and other activities, including tennis, football, badminton, wall-climbing, rope center, mini-golf, beach volleyball and spinning. University sports are under the administration of the Academic Sports Center, which is a part of the Faculty of Sciences, Humanities and Education.
