= Andrzej Schinzel =

Polish mathematician (1937–2021)

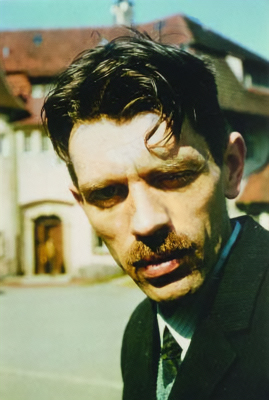
- Schinzel in 1974
- Born: 5 April 1937; Sandomierz, Poland
- Died: 21 August 2021 (aged 84)
- Education: Warsaw University
- Known for: Schinzel's hypothesis H; Schinzel's theorem; Davenport–Schinzel sequence
- Scientific career
- Fields: Mathematics
- Workplaces: Polish Academy of Sciences
- Doctoral advisor: Wacław Sierpiński
- Doctoral students: Henryk Iwaniec

Andrzej Bobola Maria Schinzel (5 April 1937 – 21 August 2021) was a Polish mathematician who specialised predominantly in number theory.

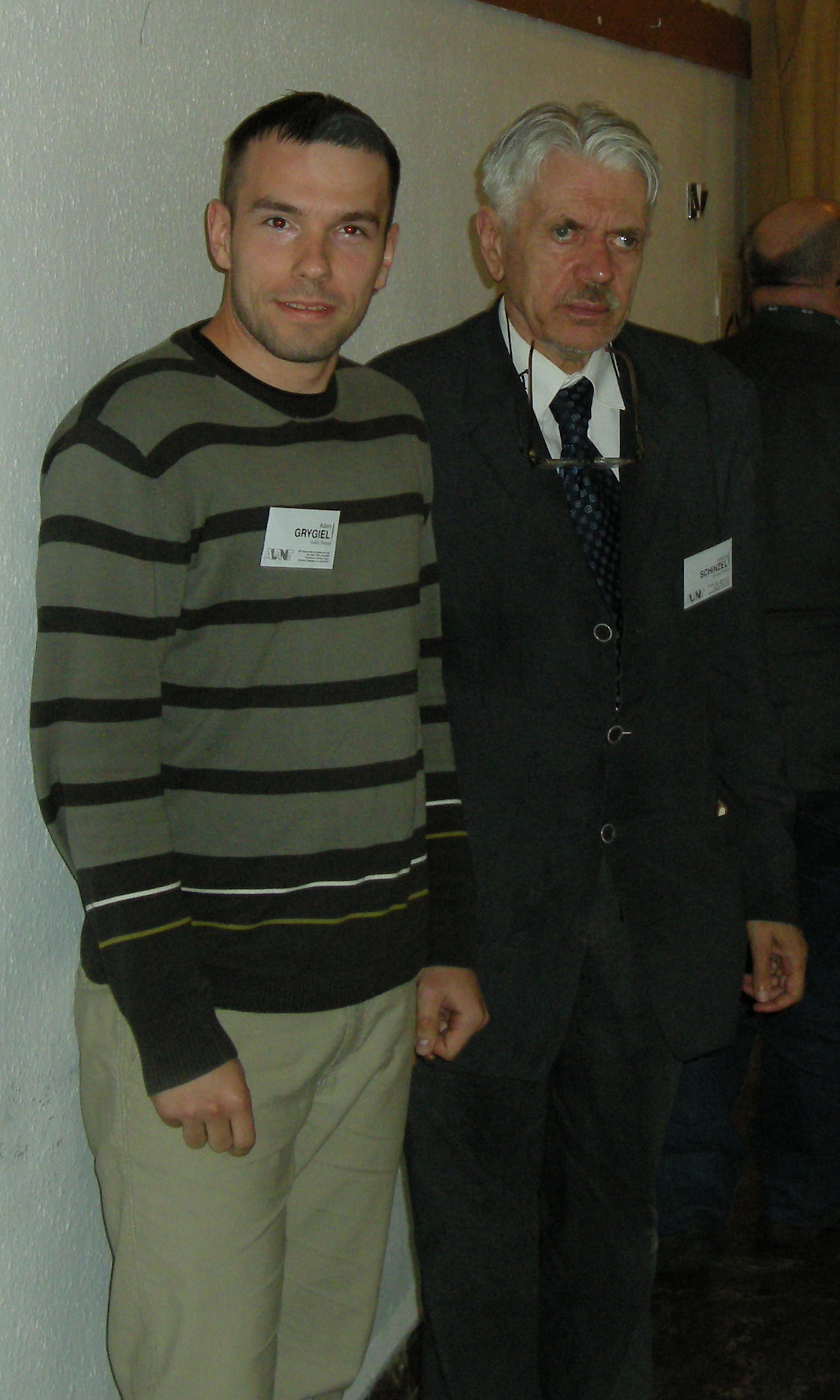
Schinzel and Adam Grygiel in 2010

== Early life and ducation ==
Born on 5 April 1937 in Sandomierz in the Second Polish Republic, he was the son of Zygmund Schinzel (1887–1974), a doctor, and Wanda Maria née Świeżyńska (1905–2001), a painter. At the age of fourteen, Schinzel became the winner of the 2nd Mathematical Olympiad in Poland.

Schinzel earned an MSc in 1958 from Warsaw University and a Ph.D. in 1960 from the Institute of Mathematics of the Polish Academy of Sciences where he studied under Wacław Sierpiński, with a habilitation in 1962. From 1960 to 1961, he was a Rockefeller Foundation fellow in Cambridge and Uppsala. He was a member of the Polish Academy of Sciences and served as Chair of the Scientific Council of the Institute of Mathematics of the Polish Academy of Sciences.

In 1982, Schinzel was awarded the Sierpiński Medal conferred jointly by the Polish Mathematical Society and the University of Warsaw.

== Career ==
Schinzel was a professor at the Institute of Mathematics of the Polish Academy of Sciences (IM PAN). His principal interest was the theory of polynomials. His 1958 conjecture on the prime values of polynomials, known as Schinzel's hypothesis H, both extends the Bunyakovsky conjecture and broadly generalizes the twin prime conjecture. He also proved Schinzel's theorem on the existence of circles through any given number of integer points.

Schinzel authored over 200 research articles in various branches of number theory, including elementary, analytic and algebraic number theory. He served as the editor of Acta Arithmetica for over four decades.

Schinzel collaborated with many colleagues, including Paul Erdős and Barbara Rokowska. He was awarded the Commander's Cross of ther Order of Polonia Restituta for his contributions to mathematics.

== Private life ==
Andrzej Schinzel was the elder brother of Polish chess master Władysław Schinzel (born 1943).
