= International University of Logistics and Transport in Wrocław =

Private university in Wrocław, Poland

The International University of Logistics and Transport in Wrocław
- Międzynarodowa Wyższa Szkoła Logistyki i Transportu we Wrocławiu
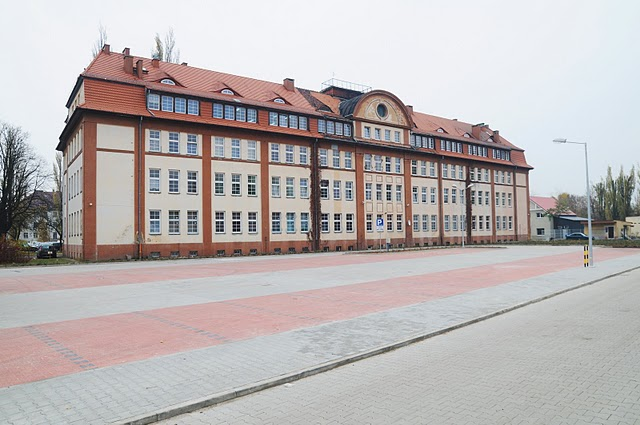
- Type: Private
- Established: 2001
- Affiliations: CILT (UK), University of Lorraine, Erasmus+ Programme
- Rector: Marcin Pawęska
- Students: 1,400
- Location: Wrocław, Lower Silesian Voivodeship, Poland
- Website: www.mwslit.com

The International University of Logistics and Transport in Wrocław (IULT; Polish: Międzynarodowa Wyższa Szkoła Logistyki i Transportu we Wrocławiu, MWSLiT) is a private university established in 2001 in Wrocław, Poland. The university was founded in cooperation with the French group École supérieure internationale de commerce (ESIDEC) in Metz. The university offers several majors: logistics, transport, civil engineering and management.

== History ==
The International University of Logistics and Transport in Wrocław was established in 2001 on the initiative of the Association for Building the Integrated Logistics Center in Wrocław.

The creation of the university in cooperation with the ESIDEC group was awarded the prize of the French Prime Minister in 2003 for the best European educational project, among 92 projects from the whole world. The IULT was also awarded the "Trusted school" certificate by the Academic Information Centre. Obtaining the accreditation to launch the Logistics postgraduate studies in 2007 was a milestone in the university's history.

== Authorities ==
- Rector: Marcin Pawęska
- Dean: Józef Puchalski
- Chancellor Jolanta Czyż

== Rectors ==
- 2001–2002: Zbigniew Korzeń
- 2002–2006: Stanisław Marian Krawczyk
- 2006–2008: Andrzej Wacław Bujak
- 2008–2012: Janusz Zierkiewicz
- 2012–2017: Zbigniew Sebastian
- 2017–present: Marcin Pawęska

== Organizational structure ==
- The Faculty of Logistics and Transport
- Logistics section
- Transport section
- Civil Engineering section
- Management section
- Additional sections
- Computer science study center
- Physical education center

== List of majors ==
- Logistics (undergraduate – 6 semesters), (engineering – 7 semesters), (postgraduate – 3 semesters)
- Logistics (postgraduate with English as the language of instruction – 4 semesters)
- Transport (undergraduate – 6 semesters)
- Civil engineering (engineering – 7 semesters)
- Management (undergraduate – 6 semesters)

In addition, the university offers various postgraduate courses:

- International supply chains logistics
- Roads and bridges utilization and maintenance
- Railway utilization and maintenance
- Logistics technician – forwarding technician
- Logistics systems in trade and distribution
- Strategic purchasing
- Modern management of logistics and production
- Cargo organization and management
- Balanced management of construction investments
- Local action groups manager

== International cooperation ==
As a result of cooperation with the University of Lorraine, graduates receive two diplomas: a Polish one and a French one. Selected courses are taught in English. The IULT takes part in the Erasmus+ programme. The university is a part of the Cartagena Network of Engineers – an association of 70 universities around the world, involved in educating engineers. The International University of Logistics and Transport in Wrocław is the only university in the Central-Eastern Europe to be accredited by the Chartered Institute of Logistics and Transport in the UK - CILT (UK). Consequently, graduates receive the CILT (UK) certificate.
