= Multipurpose company =

U.S. Army battalion-level combined arms company

Multi-purpose company
- Active: 2024–present
- Country: United States
- Branch: United States Army
- Type: Combined arms company
- Role: Reconnaissance and security; indirect fire support; anti-armor; loitering munition strike
- Size: Company (varies by MTOE)
- Part of: Infantry battalion, Mobile Brigade Combat Team
- Equipment: Infantry Squad Vehicle; 81 mm and 120 mm mortars; FGM-148 Javelin; Switchblade loitering munitions; small unmanned aircraft systems and ground robots

The multi-purpose company (MPC; also rendered multipurpose company) is a United States Army company introduced as part of the conversion of Infantry Brigade Combat Teams (IBCTs) to Mobile Brigade Combat Teams (MBCTs). One MPC is assigned to each of the three infantry battalions in an MBCT and consolidates the battalion's scout, mortar, anti-tank, and uncrewed-systems enablers under a single company headquarters. The MPC operates as the battalion counterpart to the brigade's multifunctional reconnaissance company (MFRC), with which it is designed to integrate sensor and strike capabilities across echelons.

The first MPC, Wardog Company of the 1st Battalion, 502nd Infantry Regiment, was activated on 1 March 2024 in the 2nd Brigade Combat Team, 101st Airborne Division, as that brigade transitioned into the Army's prototype MBCT under the Transformation in Contact (TiC) initiative. The MPC replaces the infantry battalion's previous assault company (sometimes called the heavy weapons company), pulling the battalion's mortar and scout platoons out of the headquarters and headquarters company (HHC) and adding new robotics and autonomous systems (RAS), anti-tank, and lethal uncrewed systems (LUS) elements.

== Background ==
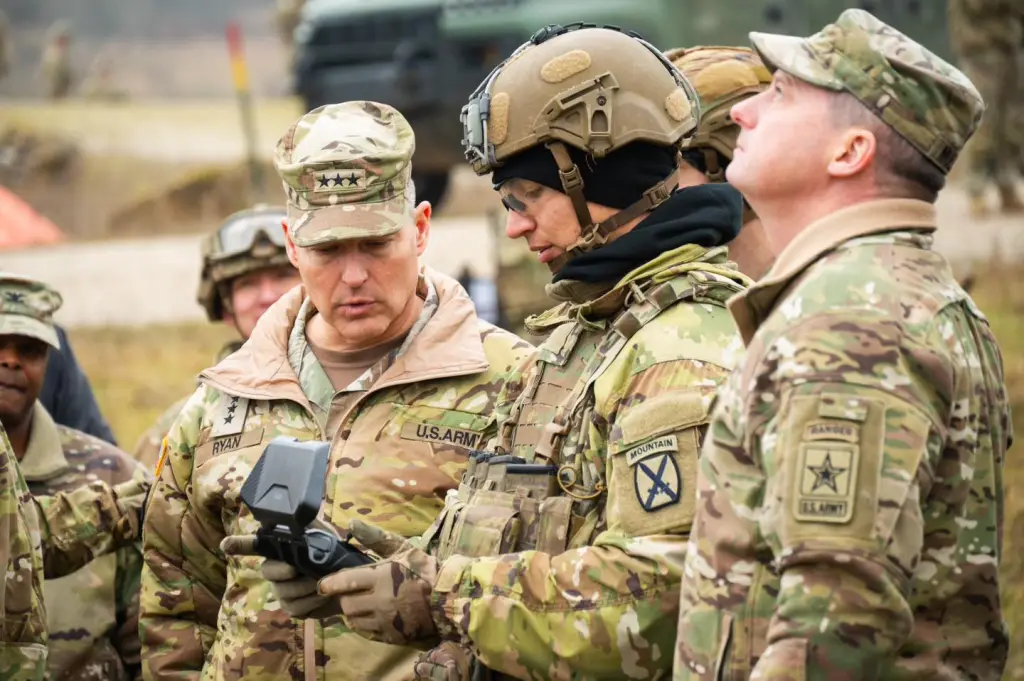
Army Deputy Chief of Staff Lt. Gen Joseph A. Ryan observes a drone controller from the 10th Mountain Division's 3rd BCT as part of MPC evaluations

=== Predecessor companies ===
The MPC's lineage in the IBCT runs through a series of consolidated combat support companies that have appeared and disappeared in U.S. Army infantry battalions since the 1960s. From 1960, infantry battalions fielded a combat support company that consolidated scouts, heavy mortars, and anti-tank elements under a single headquarters; the structure was eliminated under the Reorganization Objective Army Division (ROAD) restructuring in 1962 and reintroduced in modified form in subsequent reorganizations. In the IBCT structure that preceded the MBCT, the battalion's scout, mortar, and sniper sections sat under HHC, while a separate D Company (the "assault" or weapons company) served as the battalion's heavy-weapons element.

=== Transformation in Contact ===
The MPC emerged from the same experimentation cycle that produced the MFRC. Beginning in early 2024, three IBCTs—2nd Brigade, 101st Airborne Division; 3rd Brigade, 10th Mountain Division; and 2nd Brigade, 25th Infantry Division—participated in TiC 1.0, receiving new uncrewed systems, electronic warfare equipment, and force-structure modifications under an Army initiative to push lessons from the war in Ukraine rapidly into operational units. While the MFRC was created at the brigade level to fill the gap left by deactivated cavalry squadrons, the MPC was created at the battalion level to consolidate organic enablers under a single commander capable of fighting them as an integrated team.

The robotics and autonomous systems platoon now organic to the MPC traces its origin to parallel experimentation by the Maneuver Center of Excellence experimental force (EXFOR), Alpha Company, 1st Battalion, 29th Infantry Regiment, at Fort Moore, Georgia. During Project Convergence – Capstone 4 at Fort Irwin in March 2024, the EXFOR fielded an experimental RAS platoon integrating ground robots and uncrewed aircraft to scout and shape objectives ahead of dismounted infantry. Concepts validated by the EXFOR and a second RAS platoon were forwarded to the Combined Arms Center at Fort Leavenworth for incorporation into the Army's force design, informing the RAS platoons subsequently embedded in the MBCT's multi-purpose companies.

The 10th Mountain Division's 3rd Brigade initially fielded its battalion-level enabler companies under the name "Strike companies" before the MPC nomenclature was standardized across the MBCT-transition brigades.

== Mission ==
The MPC is intended to give the infantry battalion commander a dedicated reconnaissance, fires, and strike formation able to shape the battalion's close fight and feed targeting data both up to the brigade and laterally to adjacent units. Its core tasks are route and area reconnaissance, counter-reconnaissance, indirect fire support, anti-armor engagement, and the delivery of loitering munitions against high-payoff targets. In the MBCT construct, the MPC works in concert with the brigade's MFRC: where the MFRC ranges into the brigade deep area with electronic warfare assets and longer-range UAS, the MPC operates in the battalion's close and shaping areas and is often the unit that handles targets cued by MFRC sensors.

== Organization ==
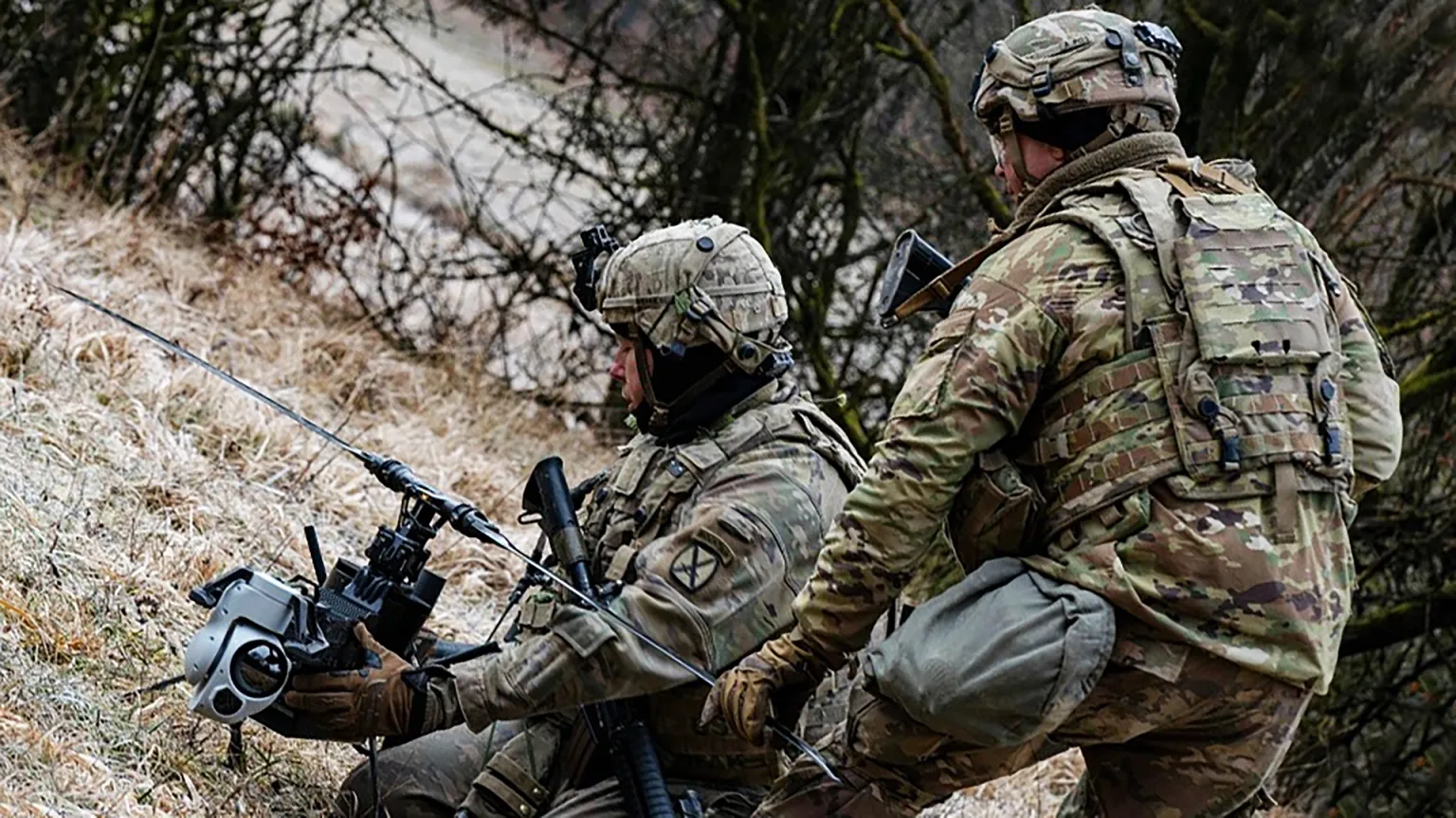
Troops from the 10th Mountain Division’s 3rd Combat Brigade Team evaluate the MPC concept during Exercise Combined Resolve 25-1 at Joint Multinational Readiness Center, Hohenfels, Germany.

There is no single doctrinal MPC table of organization; each MBCT-transition brigade has fielded its MPC under a modified table of organization and equipment (MTOE) shaped by its own experimentation. Common elements across MPCs include a scout platoon, a mortar platoon, an anti-tank platoon, and a platoon dedicated to uncrewed systems—variously designated as a robotics and autonomous systems (RAS), lethal uncrewed systems (LUS), or drone platoon depending on the brigade.

=== 1st Battalion, 502nd Infantry Regiment (Wardog Company) ===
When the 1st Battalion, 502nd Infantry Regiment activated Wardog Company on 1 March 2024, the new MPC absorbed the battalion's scout, mortar, and sniper sections from HHC and stood up a dismounted anti-tank platoon and a robotics and autonomous systems platoon. The MPC command team took tactical control of the scout, RAS, and AT platoons, while the battalion commander retained tactical authority over the firing of the mortar platoon, with the MPC headquarters acting in an administrative role. The RAS platoon was further organized into two UAS sections—a medium-range section for collection against priority intelligence requirements and a long-range section capable of cueing and operating Switchblade 600 loitering munitions. The battalion also reduced its 120 mm mortar holdings in favor of a greater number of 81 mm tubes carried on a hybrid fleet of Infantry Squad Vehicles (ISVs) and HMMWVs, a choice intended to support air-assault employment.

=== 3rd Brigade, 10th Mountain Division ===
By early 2025, the 10th Mountain Division's MPC employed during Exercise Combined Resolve 25-1 at the Joint Multinational Readiness Center in Hohenfels, Germany, fielded about 80 soldiers in three platoons: a 31-soldier scout platoon equipped with scout snipers, FGM-148 Javelin anti-tank missiles, and Performance Drone Works C100 quadcopters; a 23-soldier mortar platoon with towed 120 mm mortars and HMMWV prime movers; and a 26-soldier LUS platoon equipped with Switchblade 600 loitering munitions. The scout platoon used M1301 Infantry Squad Vehicles for ground maneuver.

=== Robotics and autonomous systems ===
The MPC's RAS or LUS platoon is the company's most novel element relative to its predecessor formations. In the experimental EXFOR platoon that informed the design, soldiers employed the Ghost-X uncrewed aircraft system; the Ghost Robotics Vision 60 quadrupedal unmanned ground vehicle (Q-UGV), a mid-sized robot offering reconnaissance and situational awareness; and the Small Multipurpose Equipment Transport (SMET), an eight-wheeled "robotic mule" able to carry equipment or be fitted with mission payloads. During concept testing the Army also experimented with arming Q-UGVs—mounting an AR-15/M16-pattern rifle on a rotating turret with an artificial-intelligence-enabled targeting system—primarily in a counter-drone role, though such armed configurations were demonstrations rather than fielded MPC equipment. As fielded in the 101st Airborne Division's MPCs, the platoon emphasizes its UAS sections for reconnaissance and loitering-munition employment rather than armed ground robots.

== Capabilities and equipment ==
MPCs are equipped with a mix of organic indirect-fire, anti-armor, and uncrewed-systems capability. Reported equipment includes 81 mm and 120 mm mortars; the Switchblade 300 and Switchblade 600 loitering munitions, fielded under the Army's Lethal Unmanned Systems Directed Requirement (also associated with the Low Altitude Stalking and Strike Ordnance, or LASSO, program); small commercial-derivative reconnaissance UAS such as the Ghost-X and the Performance Drone Works C100; ground robots including the Q-UGV and SMET; FGM-148 Javelin and dismounted TOW anti-armor systems; and the Infantry Squad Vehicle for ground maneuver. Targeting workflows pair the MPC's RAS or LUS platoon with the mortar platoon, with the long-range UAS section cueing fires and the mortars firing on grids derived from drone imagery. During training in 2024, the 3rd Brigade, 10th Mountain Division reported that approximately 90 percent of fire missions during one rotation at the Joint Multinational Readiness Center were observed through drones, with 50 percent fewer artillery rounds expended but a threefold increase in target effects compared to baseline accuracy.

== Employment ==
Doctrinal employment of the MPC remains under development, but commanders' written accounts describe three principal modes of use. The MPC may operate with its platoons fighting independently as battalion enablers; as a consolidated company conducting reconnaissance, counter-reconnaissance, or screen operations under the MPC commander; or task-organized into multi-functional reconnaissance teams (MFRTs) that combine reconnaissance and anti-tank capabilities for forward operations. The MPC commander is described as both a staff contributor and a frontline leader: upon receiving a mission, the commander moves to the battalion main command post to help develop reconnaissance guidance, the information collection matrix, and the initial fires plan, then returns forward to fight the company. One MPC commander characterized the role as that of a "maneuverist who leads the company on the battlefield," best employed forward with the enabler platoons to manage friction points and consolidate reports for the battalion.

=== Relationship with the multifunctional reconnaissance company ===
Within the MBCT, the MPC and the brigade's multifunctional reconnaissance company (MFRC) form complementary layers of a single reconnaissance and strike architecture, distinguished primarily by echelon and reach. The MFRC operates as the brigade's primary reconnaissance and targeting asset in the brigade deep area, fielding tactical UAS, electronic warfare, and effects platoons under direct brigade control; the MPCs conduct security and counter-reconnaissance for the infantry battalions in the close and shaping areas.

The two formations are linked by a find–fix–finish chain in which the MFRC primarily senses and the supported unit finishes. Within the MFRC, the hunter-killer platoons find and fix the enemy using ground reconnaissance and small UAS, while the multi-domain effects platoon can itself finish targets through kinetic or non-kinetic fires. Alternatively, when a target falls within a battalion's area of operations or exceeds the MFRC's organic effects, the sensing platoon can hand the target off to the supported battalion, where the MPC engages it with mortars, anti-tank systems, or loitering munitions. Because the MFRC can also task-organize UAS and EW teams forward to subordinate battalions during distributed operations, those teams frequently integrate directly with the MPC once in sector, giving the battalion an additional sensing layer to cue its own fires.

The MPC reproduces a similar sensor-to-shooter handoff internally. In the 1st Battalion, 502nd Infantry Regiment's MPC, the robotics and autonomous systems platoon's medium-range UAS section collects against named areas of interest and conducts an observation handoff to a long-range UAS section, which can then strike with onboard payloads or as Switchblade operators, or pass the target to the mortar platoon, whose fire missions are synchronized with the company's common operating picture. This redundancy of sensors—observing the same target from multiple platforms and angles before a strike—is described by MPC commanders as central to the company's effectiveness and to feeding an accurate picture upward to the brigade and the MFRC's targeting workflow.

== Operational history ==
=== 2nd Brigade, 101st Airborne Division ===
The MPCs of the 2nd Brigade, 101st Airborne Division were first tested in the field during Operation Lethal Eagle 24.1 at Fort Campbell in April 2024 and a Joint Readiness Training Center (JRTC) rotation later that summer at Fort Johnson. During the JRTC rotation, the brigade's LUS soldiers operated reconnaissance drones to cue 81 mm mortar fires against opposing-force positions, although they did not employ Switchblade munitions during the exercise. 1st Battalion, 502nd Infantry's Wardog Company conducted route reconnaissance, area reconnaissance, and counter-reconnaissance missions during JRTC 24-10 in August 2024, including a route reconnaissance west of Route Iridium to identify a bypass for the brigade's main effort.

=== 1st Battalion, 26th Infantry Regiment ===
During preparation for JRTC 24-10, 1st Battalion, 26th Infantry Regiment employed its MPC during the rotation's joint forcible entry phase to establish a screen for the battalion. The company kept its platoons consolidated during defensive operations and reorganized into MFRTs for forward reconnaissance tasks—an early documented use of the MFRT construct.

=== 3rd Brigade, 10th Mountain Division ===
The 3rd Brigade, 10th Mountain Division's MPC was employed during Exercise Combined Resolve 25-1 at the Joint Multinational Readiness Center in early 2025. The brigade was the only TiC 1.0 unit to transform while forward-deployed in an active theater, and its commander, Colonel Joshua Glonek, used the rotation to refine MPC integration with rotary-wing fires and partner-nation forces.

== See also ==
- Brigade combat team
- Combat support company
- Human–machine teaming
- Infantry Squad Vehicle
- Switchblade
- Weapons company
