= Doron Aurbach =

Israeli electrochemist, materials and surface scientist

- דורון אורבך
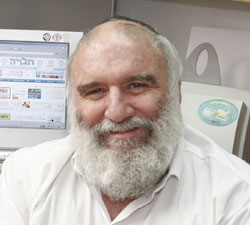
- Aurbach in 2006
- Born: September 3, 1952 (age 74); Israel
- Citizenship: Israeli
- Education: Bar Ilan University
- Awards: Israel Chemical Society (ICS) Gold Medal (2020); The Eric and Sheila Samsom Prime Minister’s Prize for Innovation in alternative fuels for Transportation (2018); Alexander Frumkin Medal of the International Society of Electrochemistry (2018); Allen J. Bard Medal of the Electrochemical Society (2017); Ernest B. Yeager award of the International Battery Association (2014)
- Scientific career
- Fields: Chemistry, electrochemistry
- Workplaces: Bar-Ilan University
- Doctoral advisor: Shmaryahu Hoz
- Other academic advisors: Ernest B. Yeager (Case Western Reserve University, Cleveland, Ohio)
- Doctoral students: Arie Zaban

Doron Aurbach (Hebrew: דורון אורבך; born 3 September 1952) is an Israeli electrochemist, materials and surface scientist.

== Biography ==
Doron Aurbach was born in 1952 in Israel to parents who survived the Holocaust and fought the 1948 Arab–Israeli War, grew up in Ramat Gan and studied in Blich High School. He served in Sayeret Golani reconnaissance unit, a.k.a. 631st Reconnaissance Battalion, (an Israeli special force unit) and fought west to the Suez Canal during the Yom Kippur War (1973). Later he returned to Golani Brigade as a deputy commander of a combat support company, and was discharged from reserve duty with a rank of a Major (Hebrew: רב סרן), at the age of 46, as a patrol officer in the Armored Corps.

He is married to Sara, an educational counselor by training who writes children's books. They live in Bnei Brak and have seven children and dozens of grandchildren.

== Academic career ==
He obtained his BSc (1977), MSc (1979) and PhD (1983, summa cum laude) from the Chemistry Department at Bar-Ilan University (BIU). In parallel to his PhD degree, he completed a full degree in chemical engineering (1981) from the Technion (Israel Institute of Technology). He was a postdoctoral fellow (1983-1985) at Case Western Reserve University (CWRU) Cleveland Ohio, led by Professor Ernest B. Yeager.

In 1985 he joined the Chemistry Department at Bar-Ilan University and founded the electrochemistry group. Since October 1996 he is a full professor in the Chemistry Department and a Senate member at BIU. Between 2001 and 2005 he chaired the Chemistry Department and between 2010 and 2016 he chaired the Israel Labs Accreditation Authority. Aurbach is the Director of the Energy and Sustainable Center of Bar-Ilan University which he founded in 2021. Aurbach's group belongs (together with other research groups from the US, Canada, Switzerland, Japan, and Germany) to a network of excellence in the field of advanced materials for power sources, founded and supported by BASF. His group benefits from a long-term collaboration with General Motors, working together on advanced power sources for electro-mobility (electric vehicles). Aurbach manages a budget of more than 56 million NIS as a founder and a leader of the Israel National Research Center for Electrochemical Propulsion (INREP), comprising 26 research groups from seven Israeli institutions supported by the Israel Council for Higher Education and the Prime-Minister's office. Aurbach is the head of the newly established center for Energy and Sustainability at Bar-Ilan University.

Aurbach is a member of the small management team called IMLB LLC Ltd of the world organization of the advanced Li batteries community. Aurbach belongs to the international scientific board of the French Energy Network RS2E and to the international scientific board of Daegu Institute of Technology (DGIST) in South Korea.

He is a Fellow of the Electrochemical Society (ECS), Materials Research Society (MRS), the International Society of Electrochemistry (ISE), and a member in the European Academy of Science (since 2015). Aurbach serves (since 2003) as an Editor for the Journal of the Electrochemical Society. During 2007 and 2015 he served also as a Senior Editor for the Journal of Solid-State Electrochemistry (Springer). Among his students are Prof. Arie Zaban, President of Bar-Ilan University, Prof. Yair Ein-Eli, Dean of the faculty of Materials Science and Engineering at the Technion, and a number of other senior academic faculty members.

== Scientific research ==
The scope of Aurbach research includes all aspects of nonaqueous electrochemistry, many kinds of batteries: Li, Li-ion, Na-ion, Mg, metal (Li, Al)-air, Li-sulfur and lead-acid systems, super and pseudocapacitors, and electrochemical water desalination. He pioneered the use of some of the most effective analytical (spectroscopic and microscopic) techniques for operando studies of the most reactive electrochemical systems (e.g. Li and Mg metal anodes in nonaqueous electrolyte solutions). In his research Aurbach was able to identify major surface reactions which lead to the passivation of active electrodes which compose rechargeable battery systems (Li, Li-C, Li-Si, lithiated transition metal oxides, Mg) in the relevant non-aqueous electrolyte solutions. His work promoted and developed important basic scientific topics which form the solid basis for the practical development of high energy density power sources. These included nonaqueous electrochemistry, active metals electrochemistry, understanding intercalation electrodes and the correlation between structure, morphology, surface chemistry and electrochemical performance of electrodes which are relevant to high energy density batteries. Prof. Aurbach also invented the field of rechargeable magnesium batteries, demonstrating working prototypes of rechargeable Mg batteries.

== Awards ==
Doron Aurbach has won several prizes, among them is the 2020 Israel Chemical Society (ICS) Gold Medal, the Eric and Sheila Samsom Prime Minister's Prize for Innovation in alternative fuels for Transportation (2018). His other awards include the Alexander Frumkin Medal of the International Society of Electrochemistry (2018), Allen J. Bard Medal of the Electrochemical Society (2017), Ernest B. Yeager award of the International Battery Association (IBA) for career-long achievements in power sources research (2014), the Kolthoff prize of the Technion for excellence in chemical research (2013), the Research Award of the Battery Division of the Electrochemical Society (2013), the Israel Chemical Society Prize of Excellence (2012), the Landau Prize for Green Chemistry (2011), the Edwards Company Prize of the Israel Vacuum Society for Research Excellence (2007) and the Technology Award of the Battery Division of the Electrochemical Society (2005).

== Publications ==
Aurbach has published more than 750 research papers in leading electrochemistry, materials science, and physical chemistry journals. These papers have been cited < 86200 times with h-index 143 (Google Scholar). The statistics from the Web of Science are h-index 127, < 68000 citations (May 2022). During 2021 alone, he was cited nearly 8400 times (Web of Science); 9800 (Google Scholar). He belongs to the most cited scientists (top 1%) in 2018-2021 as published by the Web of Science and Clarivate analytics. Aurbach is in the list of the world's most influential researchers of the past decade, demonstrated by the production of multiple highly cited papers that rank in the top 1% by citations for field and year in Web of Science. According to Research.com, a platform that offers credible data on scientific contributions, Aurbach ranks 89th and 133rd on the list of the world's leading scientists in Chemistry and Material Science, respectively. He ranks 2nd in the list of leading scientists of Israel in both fields.
