= Friedberg Geniza Project =

Digital preservation project

The Friedberg Geniza Project (FGP) is a digital preservation project, one of the primary goals of which is to computerize the entire world of Cairo Genizah manuscripts - images, identifications, catalogs, copies, joins, and bibliographic references.

== Historical background ==
At the end of the nineteenth century, a genizah was discovered in the Ben Ezra Synagogue in Cairo, containing many pages of sacred literature as well as legal and other documents. In December 1896, Prof. Solomon Schechter, a lecturer in rabbinic literature at the University of Cambridge, arrived at the Cairo Genizah and upon his return to Cambridge, brought with him 220,000 fragments, most of which were then transferred to the Geniza collection at Cambridge. About 100,000 more pieces have been scattered around the world and are now in about 60 libraries and various collections globally. The fragments which were found made a huge contribution to research in all branches of Judaism. By the end of the 20th century, many scholars physically had to set foot in libraries around the world in order to browse the genizah. Most of the material was photographed and is among the microfilms of the Institute of Microfilmed Hebrew Manuscripts at the National Library of Israel in Jerusalem.

== The website ==
In 2008, the Friedberg Project website was launched at the initiative of Canadian researcher and philanthropist Albert Dov Friedberg. The genizah fragments were scanned for the site in excellent quality scan. Prof. Yaacov Choueka, one of the founders of the Responsa Project at Bar-Ilan University, and the lead researcher of the Rav-Milim project was enlisted for the Friedberg Project and implemented it with the help of a team of researchers and programmers. Today, the Geniza website, with over 400,000 digital images is the largest virtual collection of medieval Hebrew manuscripts in the world. The site is equipped with advanced software and research tools, and contains, in addition to the images, close to half a million other data items collected from the fruits of a century of genizah research.

In 2017, the National Library of Israel (NLI) and the Friedberg Jewish Manuscript Society (FJMS) announced a joint venture in which projects previously affiliated with FJMS, including the FGP, would gradually be integrated into the NLI technological infrastructure. The NLI and the FGP created the International Collection of Digitized Hebrew Manuscripts, also known as Ktiv. This was a joint effort to digitally preserve multispectral, high-quality digital versions of all 100,000 Hebrew manuscripts which are believed to exist throughout the world today.

== Other projects of the Friedberg Jewish Manuscript Society (FJMS) ==
The Hachi Garsinan site for variants of the Babylonian Talmud - including pictures and copies of all the witnesses of the Talmudic text: genizah passages, manuscripts and old prints. The site also includes a computerized synopsis for the entire Talmud in a number of viewing options that allow the user to highlight changes. The site also includes the collection of manuscripts of Talmudic literature, edited by Prof. Yaakov Sussman including hundreds of corrections. The academic director was Dr. Menachem Katz.

The Judeo-Arabic corpus - includes over a hundred works in this language, a total of about four million words. Associated with it is a complete bibliography of all publications in Judeo-Arabic.

The Nahum Genizah website - contains manuscripts from the Yemenite genizah collected by Yehuda Levy Nahum, who founded the "Exposure of Yemeni Manuscripts" initiative.

Yad HaRambam - includes a synoptic edition of Maimonides' great book Mishneh Torah based on manuscripts and old printed editions, along with hundreds of commentaries and novellae written around it.

The Mahadura website - contains various and varied manuscripts, and allows researchers and those interested to use a powerful tool for copying manuscripts, and for creating a computerized and advanced synopsis.
