= Brigade support battalion =

USA combat service support battalion

A brigade support battalion (BSB) is a combat service support battalion of the United States Army. A BSB is an organic part of a brigade combat team (BCT), providing self-sustainment to the BCT for up to 72 hours of high-intensity combat before requiring replenishment. It consists of a headquarters and headquarters company, field maintenance company, distribution company, medical company, and a forward support company assigned to each of the other battalions in the BCT.

A brigade support battalion is also a component unit of a combat aviation brigade, maneuver enhancement brigade, fires brigade and battlefield surveillance brigade, but without the medical company.

== Overview ==
A BSB is a multifunctional logistics unit that supports its parent brigade at the tactical level with supply distribution and management, field maintenance, and medical support. It is an expeditionary formation that deploys with its supported brigade, including (for airborne forces) conducting parachute assault operations. While each forward support company (FSC) operates in close proximity with their supported battalion, the rest of the BSB operates from a base or base cluster in a designated brigade support area (BSA). From the BSA, the BSB commander executes command and control (C2) of BSB units based on orders from the brigade commander; the BSB commander also coordinates with the Division Sustainment Support Battalion (DSSB) for capabilities it lacks, such as light infantry troop transportation or water treatment, via the Division Sustainment Brigade (DSB). The BSB is responsible for protecting the BSA from low-level threats using its organic equipment and may provide limited support for other units passing through its area of operations as directed by the brigade commander.

== Organization ==
=== Headquarters and Headquarters Company ===
The Headquarters and Headquarters Company (HHC) provides command and control, administrative and logistical support for all units assigned or attached to the BSB. It can also provide command and control for security units occupying the brigade support area (BSA) and support for other units operating within the battalion’s area. It consists of a command group, coordinating staff, and headquarters company.

The command group consists of a commander, executive officer (XO), command sergeant major, and unit ministry team (UMT). The BSB commander exerts overall command and control of the unit and acts as the senior logistician of the brigade, providing information and advice to the brigade commander and their staff to develop a viable sustainment plan. The XO is second-in-command of the BSB with responsibilities including oversight of the staff, establishing and overseeing the functioning of the BSB command post (CP), and directing the positioning and overall readiness of units assigned and attached to the BSB. The command sergeant major, as the senior enlisted member of the BSB, provides knowledge, experience and advice to the commander and communicates with the sergeants major of other supported units to resolve issues for the BSB. Other duties vary based on the commander's needs, such as conducting base defense oversight. The UMT consists of a chaplain and religious affairs specialists and provides religious support to soldiers and authorized civilians as per the BSB commander. The chaplain also provides the commander with advice on religious, moral, ethical and morale issues.

=== Distribution company ===
The role of the distribution company is to manage the daily receipt, storage, and issuance of supply class I, II, III, IV, V and IX in support of its parent brigade. Supplies are received from the division sustainment support battalion (DSSB) and distributed one of two ways: they can be directly delivered to the supporting forward support companies (FSCs), or the company will maintain a central supply point from which the FSCs come to pick up supplies. It is led by a company commander, executive officer and first sergeant, and consists of three platoons: a transportation platoon, a supply platoon, and a fuel and water platoon.

The transportation platoon, led by a platoon leader and platoon sergeant, provides motor transport support as part of the BSB's distribution management process. In armored or Stryker BCTs, the platoon will have four truck squads, while those operating with infantry BCTs will have three squads. While the transportation platoon can be used to resupply other units, in most BSBs the distribution company will maintain a central resupply point from which supplies are picked up. Instead the platoon is kept in reserve to conduct internal movement within the BSA or for high-priority missions.

The supply platoon includes a multiclass Supply Support Activity (SSA) operated by the general supply section and a Modular Ammunition Transfer Point (MATP) operated by the MATP section. The SSA serves as the point in which supplies are received and stored and would be established in a secure location which allows for easy access. The MATP serves a similar function for the receipt and temporary holding of ammunition, with the MATP section (consisting of an ammunition section chief and several ammunition teams) also able to perform limited munitions maintenance.

The fuel and water platoon conducts the temporary storage and distribution of fuel and water for the brigade. The fuel section, in addition to storing and issuing bulk petroleum using HEMTT tankers and modular fuel system trailers, has limited petroleum fuel testing capability. The number and type of equipment depends on the type of brigade being supported. The water section has the capability to store and distribute 23,000 gallons of potable water with ten compatible water tank rack systems (HIPPOs) and one forward area water point supply system (FAWPSS). However only water sections operating as part of a combat aviation brigade have a water treatment capability.

=== Field Maintenance Company ===
The field maintenance company's mission is to perform field-level maintenance support on or near unserviceable equipment or weapon systems for its parent brigade and BSB. The types of equipment covered include automotive, ground support, communications and electronics, land combat missile systems, and armament systems. Field-level maintenance includes not only removal and replacement of components but repair of components, with the ultimate goal of returning systems to operational status as quickly and as close as possible to the point of failure or damage. Services provided by the company include welding, machine shop support, battle damage assessment, and recovery support. The company consists of a company headquarters consisting a company commander, executive office and first sergeant; a platoon headquarters; and a maintenance platoon.

The platoon headquarters consists of a headquarters section, maintenance control section, and recovery section. The maintenance control section supervises the unit's field-level maintenance activities, serves as collection point for all maintenance records, stocks components for shop operations, and manages all maintenance and recovery operations within the BSA. The recovery section provides welding and lift capability for the repair shops, recovery operations for BSB units and units operating within the BSA, and limited assistance to FSCs for evacuating equipment.

The maintenance platoon provides shop and on-site field-level maintenance for the companies of the BSB, assistance to the FSCs, and (when able) additional support to other units traversing through the brigade's area of operation. It consists of a field maintenance section which provides maintenance for the BSB's automotive and track vehicles; a ground support equipment repair section which provides maintenance for power generation, construction, quartermaster and utilities equipment; a communications and ground repair section; a missile and electronic repair section; and an armament repair section.

=== Brigade Support Medical Company ===
The brigade support medical company (BSMC) colloquially known as a "Charlie Med" provides medical support to its BCT and on an area basis to any BCT units that do not have their own medical assets. The BSMC will set up its headquarters and a Role 2 field hospital in the BSA, typically with the BSB headquarters on the BSB base as it has limited self-defense capability. The BSMC consists of a company headquarters, a preventative medicine section, a mental health section, a medical treatment platoon, a medical evacuation platoon, and a brigade medical supply office. The BSMC may also be augmented with forward surgical teams as required.

=== Forward Support Company ===
Forward support companies (FSCs) are organic to the BSBs of a BCT, combat aviation brigade, and Special Forces Group. Their mission is to provide direct support to the other battalions of its parent brigade. This includes field feeding, bulk fuel, general supply, ammunition, and field-level maintenance to the supported battalion. It may also provide support to other units in the brigade on a limited basis. Because of its close support, an FSC may be placed under the operational control of its supported battalion's commander as necessary. FSCs are structured similarly, with a headquarters section, distribution platoon, and maintenance platoon, with differences in maintenance and petroleum, oil and lubricant (POL) distribution capability. The headquarters section includes a food service section which provides food support and preparation for the FSC and its supported battalion.

The distribution platoon consists of a platoon headquarters (a platoon leader and platoon sergeant) and four squads which manage the distribution of supply classes I, II, III, IV, V and IX received by the FSC to the supported battalion. The distribution platoon makes up part of the supported battalion's combat trains element, which provides a centralize location for battalion and FSC sustainment personnel.

The maintenance platoon performs field-level maintenance and related functions for their supported battalion. It consists of a headquarters section; a maintenance control section which tracks and manages maintenance activity for the FSC and supported battalion; a maintenance section, a service and recovery section; and several field maintenance teams which travel near the Forward Line of Own Troops.
