= Shmaryahu Hoz =

Israeli chemist (born 1945)

- שמריהו הוז
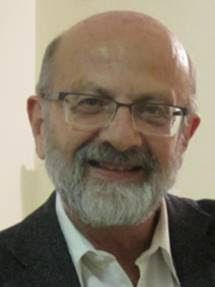
- Born: 1945 (age 80–81); Jerusalem
- Citizenship: Israeli
- Education: Hebrew University of Jerusalem; Bar-Ilan University
- Scientific career
- Fields: Physical Organic Chemistry, Computational Nanotechnology
- Workplaces: Bar Ilan University
- Academic advisors: Joseph F. Bunnett
- Doctoral students: Doron Aurbach

Shmaryahu Hoz (Hebrew: שמריהו הוז; born 1945) is a Professor Emeritus specializing in physical organic chemistry and computational nanotechnology.

== Biography ==
Shmaryahu Hoz was born in Jerusalem in 1945. He received a B.Sc. in Chemistry and Physics and an M.Sc. in Chemistry from the Hebrew University. He received his Ph.D. in Chemistry from Bar Ilan University and did post-doctoral studies at the University of California, Santa Cruz with Prof. Joseph F. Bunnett. He joined the Chemistry Department at Bar Ilan University in 1975. His major research areas are: physical organic chemistry, the chemistry of SmI_{2}, computational nanotechnology and the effects of electric fields on structure and reactivity.

== Administrative activities ==
Professor Hoz has held several administrative positions at Bar Ilan University. He served as the Head of the Department of Chemistry and subsequently as Vice President for Research of the University. In his capacity as a VPR, he established the brain research center and set in place the foundations for the School of Engineering. For many years, Professor Hoz was in charge of the parliamentary aspects of the Board of Trustees of the University and headed the By-Laws Committee of the Senate of the University.

He currently serves as senior advisor to the university president and the head of the Responsa Project.

== Scientific activities ==
His major scientific achievements are: the discovery of the catalytic effect of fluoride ion; the discovery of the zwitterionic bicyclobutane; the formulation of the leading theory on the origin of the α-effect; the relationship between nucleophilicity and the Periodic Table; the discovery of a molecule forty times harder than diamond in one dimension; the first discovery of a molecule having a negative Poisson’s ratio; the formulation of guidelines and methods for the use of SmI2 in organic reactions.
