= Aviezri Fraenkel =

Israeli mathematician (born 1929)

- אביעזרי פרנקל
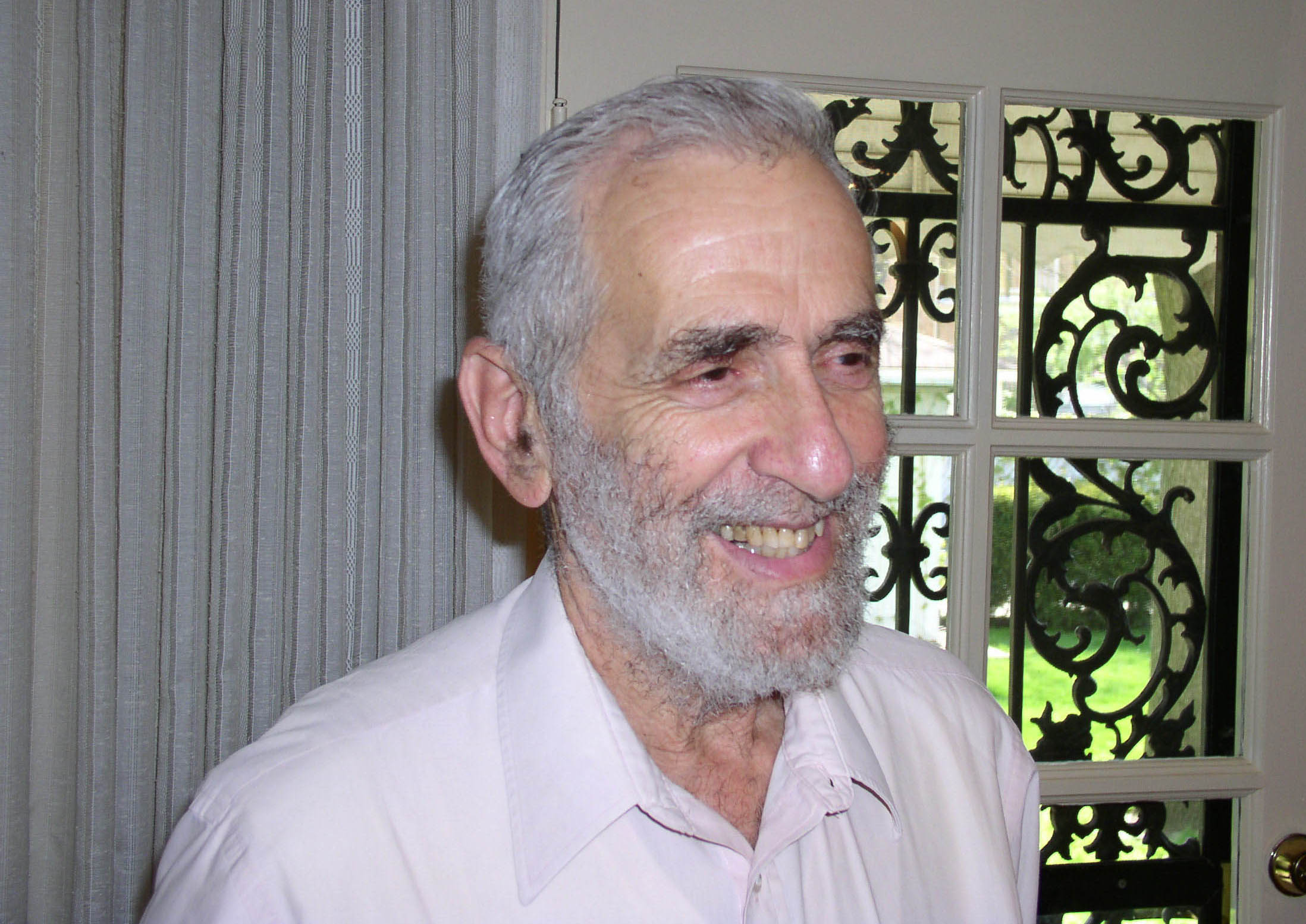
- Fraenkel in 2004
- Born: June 7, 1929 (age 97); Munich, Germany
- Awards: 2005 Euler Medal, 2006 "WEIZAC Medal", 2007 shared Israel Prize
- Scientific career
- Fields: Mathematics
- Institutions: Weizmann Institute of Science
- Doctoral advisor: Ernst G. Straus

Aviezri Siegmund Fraenkel (Hebrew: אביעזרי פרנקל; born June 7, 1929) is an Israeli mathematician who has made contributions to combinatorial game theory.

== Biography ==
Aviezri Siegmund Fraenkel was born in Munich, Germany, to a Jewish family, which then moved to Switzerland soon thereafter. In 1939 his family moved once more, to Jerusalem.

Fraenkel is married to Shaula and father of six. One of his grandchildren, Yaacov Naftali Fraenkel, was kidnapped and murdered by Hamas members in June 2014.

In 2018, in respect for his life's work, Fraenkel was given the highly regarded honor to light one of twelve torches—one for each of Twelve Tribes—at the State of Israel's televised opening ceremony on Har Herzl, Jerusalem, in celebration of Israel's 70th Independence Day.

== Academic career ==
Fraenkel received his Ph.D. in 1961 from the University of California, Los Angeles. He was a recipient of the 2005 Euler Medal, together with Ralph Faudree. On December 5, 2006, he received the "WEIZAC Medal" from the IEEE, as a member of the team that built the WEIZAC, one of the first computers in the world and the first computer built in Israel.

Fraenkel was the founder of the Bar Ilan Responsa Project, serving as its initial director (1963–74), which received the Israel Prize in 2007.

His research also delves into computational complexity, as it is important to study the complexity of algorithms which solve games.

== See also ==
- Fränkel
