= Yaacov Choueka =

Professor

- יעקב שויקה
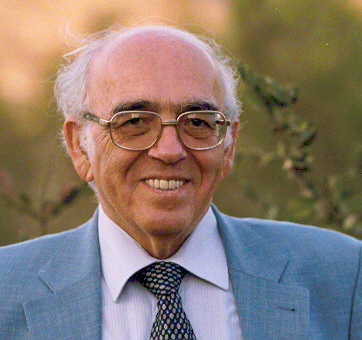
- Choueka in 2007
- Born: June, 1936; Cairo, Egypt
- Died: June 6, 2020
- Education: Hebrew University; Bar-Ilan University
- Scientific career
- Fields: Computer science; Linguistics
- Workplaces: Hebrew University, Bar-Ilan University, Bar Ilan Responsa Project, Friedberg Geniza Project

Yaacov Choueka (Hebrew: יעקב שויקה; 1936 - 2020) was a professor in the Department of Computer Science at Bar-Ilan University, where he served as head of the institute for Information Retrieval and Computational Linguistics. Until 2017, he headed Genazim - the computer unit of the Friedberg project for the study of the Genizah. His areas of expertise included systems for retrieving textual information, large textual databases, computerized processing of natural languages, especially in Hebrew, computer analysis of text, computerized dictionaries, mechanized morphology and syntax, and in electronic publishing.

He played leadership roles in:

- The Bar Ilan Responsa Project
- Friedberg Geniza Project
- "Hachi Garsinan" Talmud Bavli Variants
- Rav-Milim Dictionary

In 2019 he won the Katz Prize for his contribution to the study of halakha in its application in modern life.
