= Bar Ilan Responsa Project =

Collection of Jewish texts in Hebrew

The Bar Ilan Responsa Project (the Global Jewish Database) is a collection of Jewish texts in Hebrew, sold on CD and more recently on USB flash drive by Bar-Ilan University (in Ramat Gan, Israel). There is also an online version available by subscription.

== Background ==
The database consists of one of the world's largest electronic collections of Jewish texts in Hebrew.

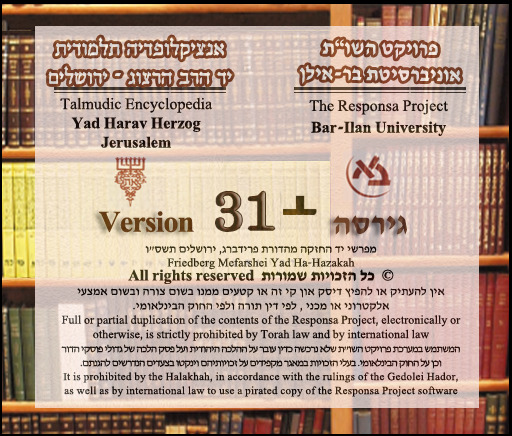
Opening screen

It includes numerous works from the Responsa Literature (rabbinic case-law rulings).

The database also includes the Bible and the Talmud (with commentaries); articles about Jewish law and customs; Maimonides' Mishneh Torah and the Shulchan Aruch with main commentaries; Zohar, Midrashim, and the Talmudic Encyclopedia.

Today the Responsa Project flash drive contains more than 100,000 Responsa and more than 420,000 hypertext links between the databases totalling 200 million words. There is also an online version available by subscription.

The project was founded by Aviezri Fraenkel who served as its initial director (1963–1974), and subsequent director Yaacov Choueka (1975–1986), as cited by the Israel Prize committee. Currently the project is headed by Shmaryahu Hoz.

== Features ==
The Features of Bar Ilan Responsa (Version 32 plus) include:

Search for a word phrase or expression in relevant texts, search for a wide collection of variant forms specify combined search components etc.

Using the hypertext links to locate and display related sources spanning thousands of years.

Save search results and other texts in order to view them or print them later with a word processor or use them in other searches.

Display biographies of hundreds of responsa authors and other Talmudic and post-Talmudic scholars from medieval times to the present.

Calculate the numerical value (gematria) of any expression and find biblical verses or expressions with any specified gematria.

Compare parallel Talmudic and other texts.

Look up abbreviations in an online dictionary.

Display Torah texts that are mentioned by other Talmudic texts with the click of a mouse (hypertext).

Search for vocalized text (Nikud) in Tanach.

Personal notes and links on the text.

Display texts by manually typing in the reference of the desired text.

Display text of the Torah and commentaries according to the weekly Torah portion.

Display interface in the following languages: in Hebrew (where Windows has Hebrew support), English and French. All texts are in Hebrew.

== Awards ==
- In 2007, the project was awarded the Israel Prize for Rabbinical literature.

== History of the database ==
- 1992 Version 1 released.
- 1995 Version 4 released.
- 1998 Version 6 released.
- 2003 Version 10 released.
- 2004 Version 12 released.
- 2007 Version 14 released.
- 2008 Version 16 released.
- 2009 Version 17 released.
- 2024 Version 32 released

== See also ==
- List of Israel Prize recipients
