= Combat support company =

A combat support company (CSC) is a company-echelon unit in some United States Army infantry battalion organizations which consolidates combat support elements of the battalion under a company headquarters.

== History ==
From 1942 - 1957, U.S. Army infantry battalions consisted of a battalion headquarters and headquarters company (HHC), three rifle companies, and a heavy weapons company composed of machine gun and mortar platoons. With the implementation of the Pentomic organization, or Reorganization of the Current Infantry Division (ROCID) organization, regiments and battalions were eliminated, and divisions were composed of five battle groups. Each battle group consisted of an HHC, four rifle companies and a 4.2-inch mortar battery. Under Table of Organization and Equipment (TOE) 7-15D, dated 1 February 1960, the CSC made its first appearance in a U.S. Army infantry battalion. Because the original battle group HHC, with over 300 soldiers assigned, was too large for efficient command and control, the new CSC contained the radar section, and the reconnaissance, heavy mortar and assault weapons (antitank) platoons while the HHC retained the engineer platoon, supply and maintenance platoon, communications platoon and the staff sections.

Combat support companies were eliminated during the development of the Reorganization Objective Army Division (ROAD) structure in 1962, with battalions containing only an HHC and three rifle companies. But CSCs soon returned during the development of the airmobile division, with each airmobile infantry battalion containing an HHC, three rifle companies and a CSC with reconnaissance, mortar and antitank platoons.

When the army began to expand for Vietnam with the organization of the 196th Infantry Brigade at Fort Devens, Massachusetts, the brigade's three infantry battalions were organized under a special "light" structure for counterinsurgency warfare. Like the airmobile infantry battalions, these battalions CSC had mortar, reconnaissance and antitank platoons. Although battalions deployed to Vietnam as infantry and airborne infantry (without CSCs) or light and airmobile infantry (with CSCs), U.S. Army, Vietnam reorganized 70 of its 72 non-mechanized infantry battalions under a modified TOE with an HHC, four rifle companies, and a CSC.

In the early 1970s, CSCs were added to the infantry, mechanized infantry, and armor battalions, retaining a single company headquarters for reconnaissance, mortar, and antitank platoons, as well as air defense and ground surveillance radar sections. However, the Army of Excellence (AOE) organization implemented in the mid-1980s eliminated CSCs in favor of antiarmor companies, with the mortar and reconnaissance platoons returning to the battalion's HHC. The Army National Guard (ARNG) retained the older organization longer than the active army, but CSCs were eliminated from ARNG units by the mid-1990s.

Although eliminated from most standard organizations, a few unique organizations retained CSCs. When the 173rd Airborne Brigade reactivated in 2001, the 173rd CSC contained a sapper platoon, a light equipment platoon, a Stinger air defense platoon and a ground surveillance radar platoon.

Currently, standard battalions do not have CSCs. Infantry, Stryker infantry and combined arms battalions have their reconnaissance (scout) and mortar platoons in the HHC, and infantry battalions have weapons companies composed of assault platoons that contain the units' heavy machine guns, TOWs and Javelins.

== See also ==
- Company (military unit)
- Headquarters and Headquarters Company
- Combat support
