= Brigade Combat Team =

Basic deployable unit of maneuver in the U.S. Army

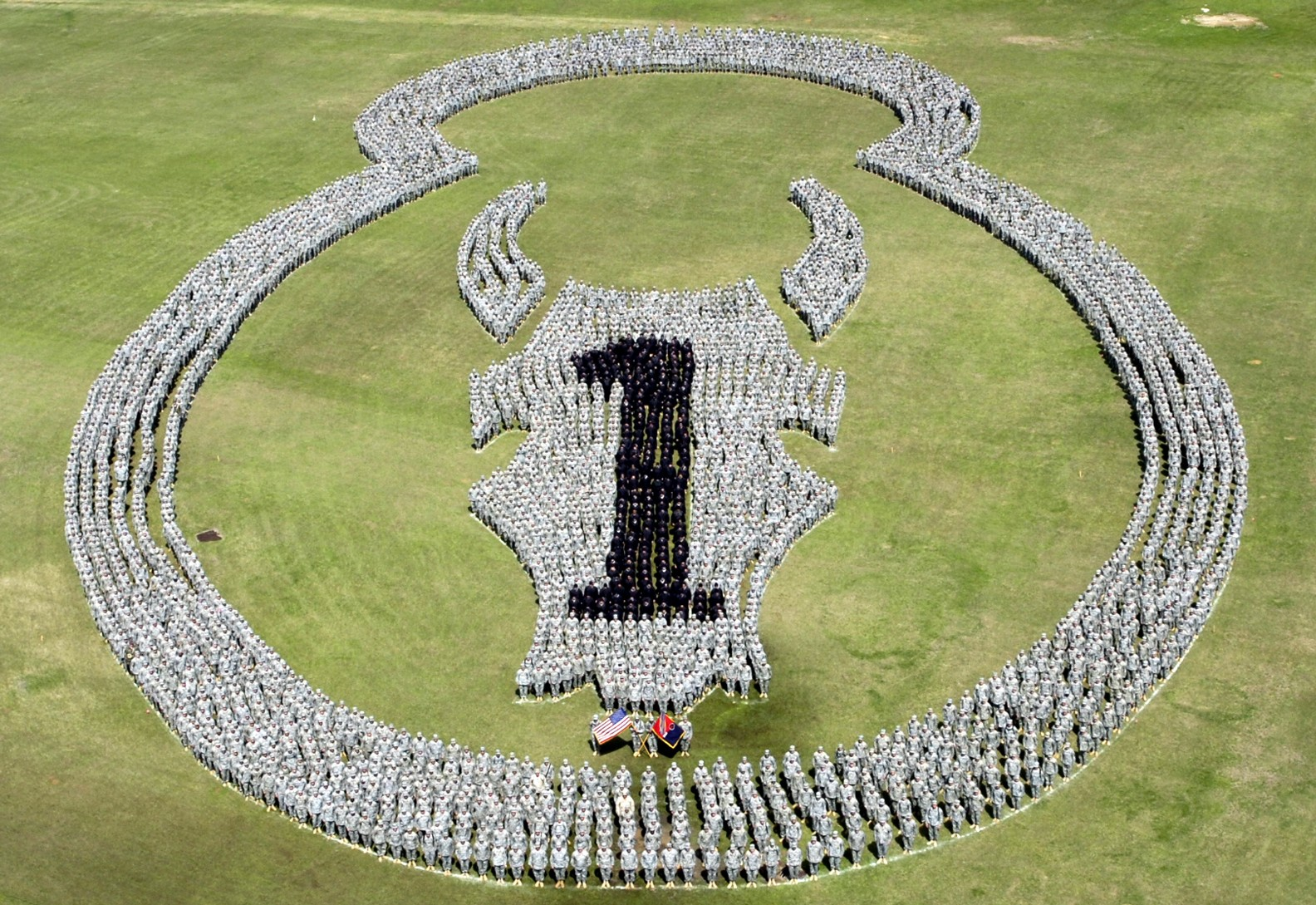
Over 4,000 members of the 1st BCT, 34th Infantry Division, in a special formation for a farewell ceremony.

The Brigade Combat Team (BCT) was the basic deployable unit of maneuver in the United States Army from about 2011-2016.

A Brigade Combat Team consisted of one combat arms branch maneuver brigade and its assigned support and fire units. A brigade is normally commanded by a colonel (O-6) although in some cases a brigadier general (O-7) may assume command. A BCT contains combat support and combat service support units necessary to sustain its operations. BCTs contain organic artillery training and support, received from the parent division artillery (DIVARTY). There were three types of Brigade Combat Teams, infantry, Stryker, and armored, until mid-2025, when the fourth variant, the Mobile Brigade Combat Team, began to be introduced, following the change in the character of war in Ukraine.

In 2011-2017 the U.S. Army was structured around the Brigade Combat Team. Divisions that previously had not deployed individual brigades due to a lack of integral support were reorganized. Multiple divisions began deploying one or more BCTs in many places around the world. These BCTs were intended to be able to stand on their own, like a division in miniature. Soldiers assigned to a BCT were intended to stay at their assignment for three years to boost readiness and improve unit cohesion.

== Infantry Brigade Combat Team ==
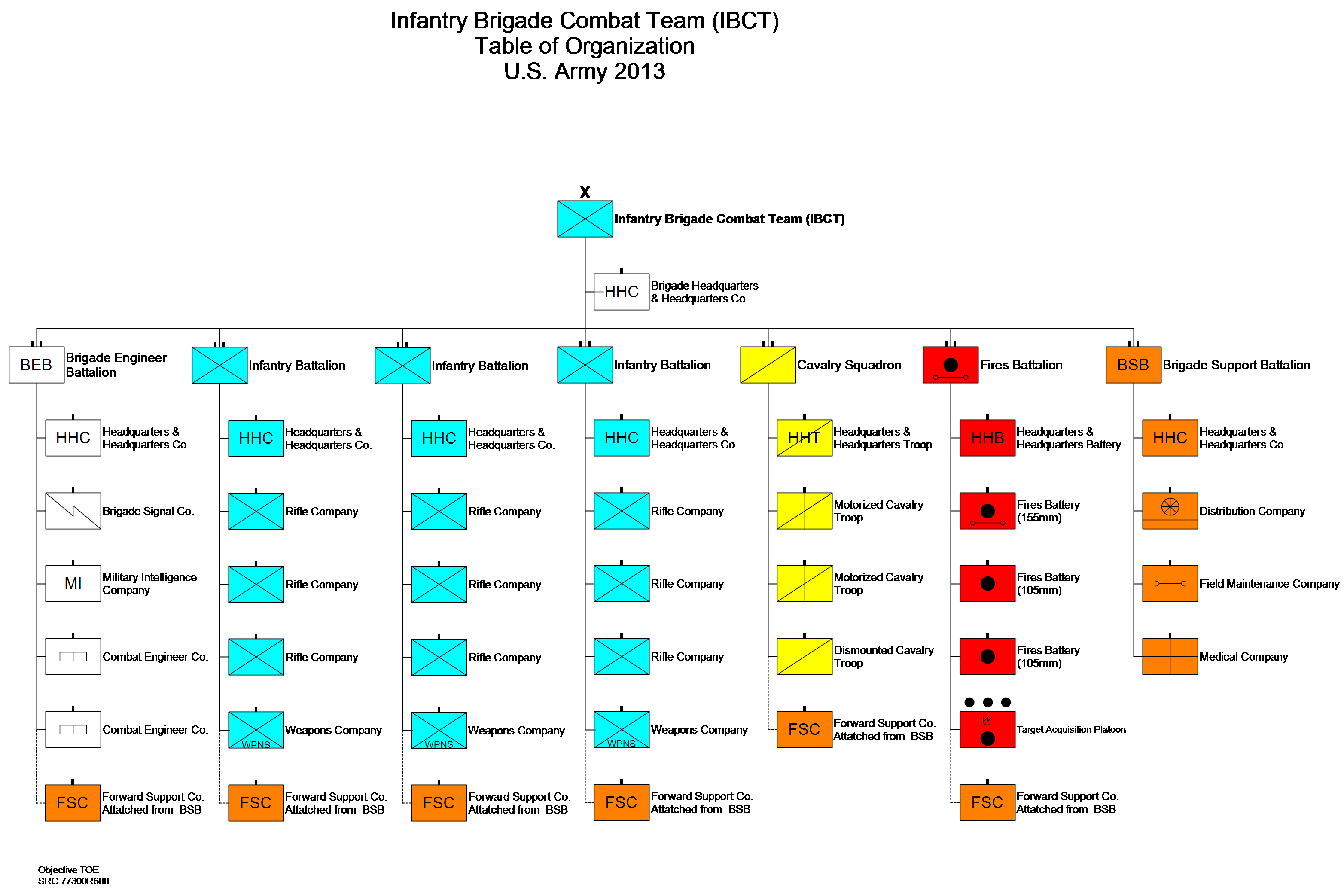
Infantry Brigade Combat Team table of organization

The Infantry Brigade Combat Team (IBCT), as of 2014, contains 4,413 soldiers and is organized around three battalions of infantry. Each type of brigade—(infantry or airborne infantry)—has the same basic organization. Each infantry brigade is equipped and capable of air assault operations. Also, most units typically maneuver in HMMWVs when deployed and operate as "motorized infantry" to facilitate speed of movement. The Infantry BCT can conduct entry operations by ground, air, and amphibious means.

Apart from the three infantry battalions, each brigade typically contains one cavalry (reconnaissance) battalion, one brigade support battalion, one engineer battalion and one field artillery (fires) battalion, totaling seven battalions. As of May 2025, all IBCTs converted to Mobile Brigade Combat Teams, equipped with the M1301 infantry squad vehicle to enhance mobility. The MBCT structure was yet to be defined.

=== Infantry battalion (×3) ===
Note: OCONUS (Hawaii, Alaska and Italy) based BCTs only have two infantry battalions

- Headquarters and headquarters company
- Rifle company (×3)
- Weapons company

=== Cavalry squadron ===
- Headquarters and headquarters troop
- Mounted cavalry troop (×2)
- Dismounted cavalry troop

=== Field artillery battalion ===
- Headquarters and headquarters battery
  - Target acquisition platoon
- M119A3 105 mm towed howitzer battery (×2)
- M777A2 155 mm towed howitzer battery

=== Brigade engineer battalion ===
- Headquarters and headquarters company
- Combat engineer company (×2)
- Signal network support company
- Military intelligence company

=== Brigade support battalion ===
- Headquarters and headquarters company
- Distribution company
- Field maintenance company
- Medical company
  - Headquarters platoon
  - Treatment platoon
  - Medical evacuation platoon
- Forward support company (reconnaissance)
- Forward support company (engineer)
- Forward support company (Field Artillery)
- Forward support company (infantry) (×3)

== Stryker Brigade Combat Team ==
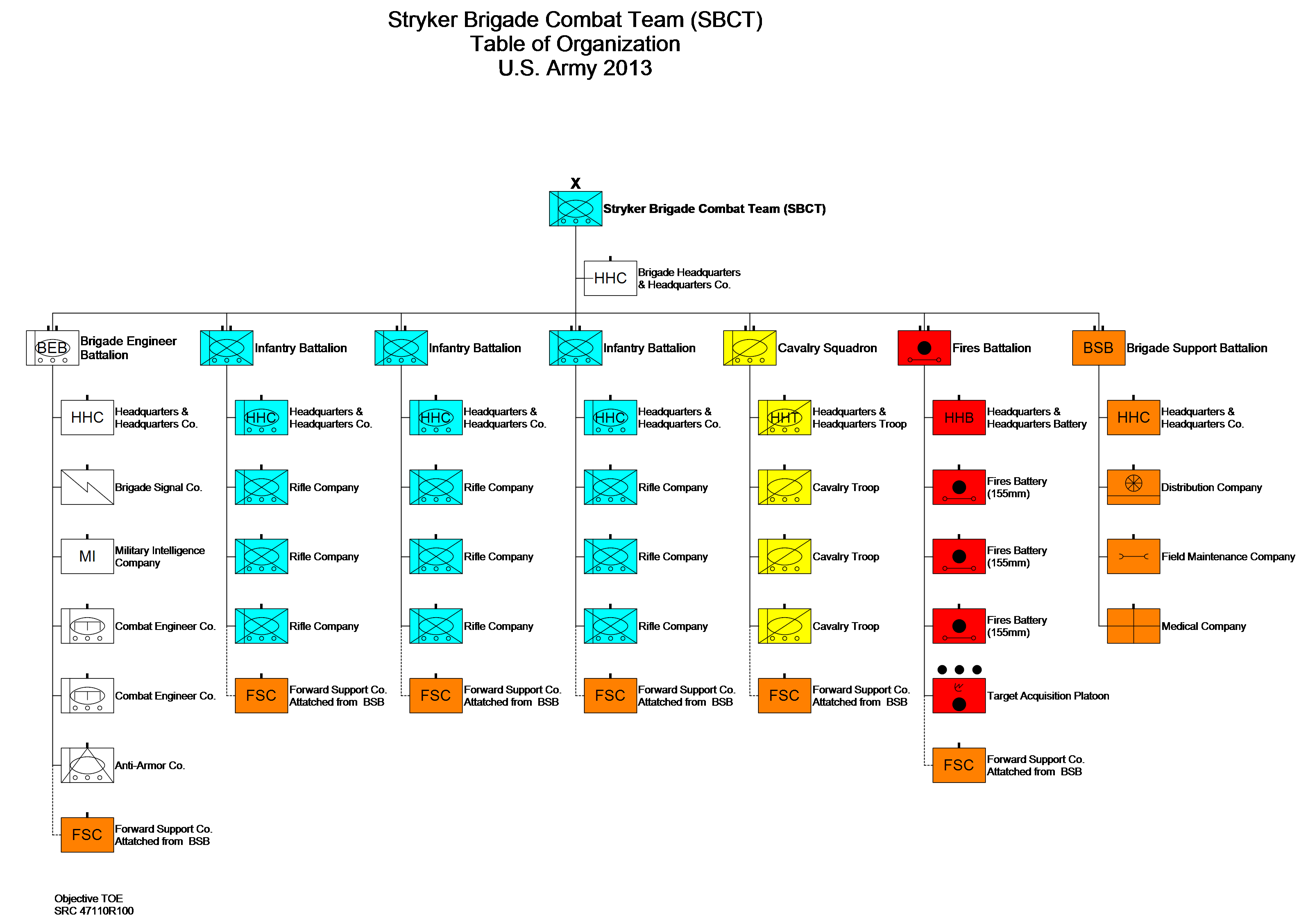
Stryker Brigade Combat Team table of organization

The Stryker Brigade Combat Team (SBCT) is a mechanized infantry force structured around the Stryker eight-wheeled variant of the General Dynamics LAV III. A full Stryker brigade was intended to be C-130 Hercules-air transportable into theatre within 96 hours, while a division-sized force is expected to need 120 hours. The Stryker brigade is an organic combined arms unit of lightly-armored, medium-weight wheeled vehicles, and is organized differently from the IBCT or ABCT. The Stryker brigades are being used to implement network-centric warfare doctrines, and are intended to fill a gap between the United States' highly mobile light infantry and its much heavier armored infantry. The team also receives training in chemical, biological, radiological, and nuclear defense (CBRN defense).

Each Stryker Brigade Combat Team consists of three infantry battalions, one reconnaissance (cavalry) squadron, one fires (artillery) battalion, one brigade support battalion, one brigade headquarters and headquarters company, and one brigade engineer battalion. A Stryker brigade is made up of more than 300 Stryker vehicles and 4,500 soldiers.

Starting in 2015, the anti-tank company was reflagged from the brigade engineer battalion to the cavalry squadron, to form a weapons troop—also incorporating the mobile gun systems from the infantry battalions. The MGS is retired since the end of 2022.

=== Infantry battalion (×3) ===
- Headquarters and headquarters company
- Infantry company (Stryker) (×3)

=== Cavalry squadron ===
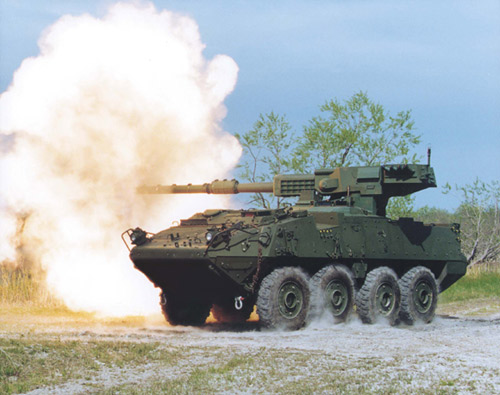
Mobile Gun System, retired since the end of 2022

- Headquarters and headquarters troop
- Cavalry troop (Stryker) (×3)
- Weapons troop (9 × ATGM)

=== Field artillery battalion ===
- Headquarters and headquarters battery
  - Target acquisition platoon
- M777A2 155 mm towed howitzer battery (×3)

=== Brigade engineer battalion ===
- Headquarters and headquarters company
- Combat engineer company
- Engineer support company
- Signal company
- Military intelligence company

=== Brigade support battalion ===
- Headquarters and headquarters company
- Distribution company
- Field maintenance company
- Medical company
  - Headquarters platoon
  - Treatment platoon
  - Medical evacuation platoon
- Forward support company (reconnaissance)
- Forward support company (engineer)
- Forward support company (Field Artillery)
- Forward support company (infantry) (×3)

=== Stryker vehicles ===
- M1126 infantry carrier vehicle
- M1127 reconnaissance vehicle
- M1128 mobile gun system armed with 105 mm overhead gun for direct fire
- M1129 mortar carrier armed with a mounted 120 mm and a dismountable 81 or 60 mm mortar
- M1130 command vehicle
- M1131 fire support vehicle (FSV) with targeting and surveillance sensors
- M1132 engineer support vehicle (ESV)
- M1133 medical evacuation vehicle (MEV)
- M1134 anti-tank guided missile vehicle (ATGM) armed with a twin TOW missile launcher
- M1135 nuclear, biological, chemical, reconnaissance vehicle (NBC RV)

== Armored Brigade Combat Team ==
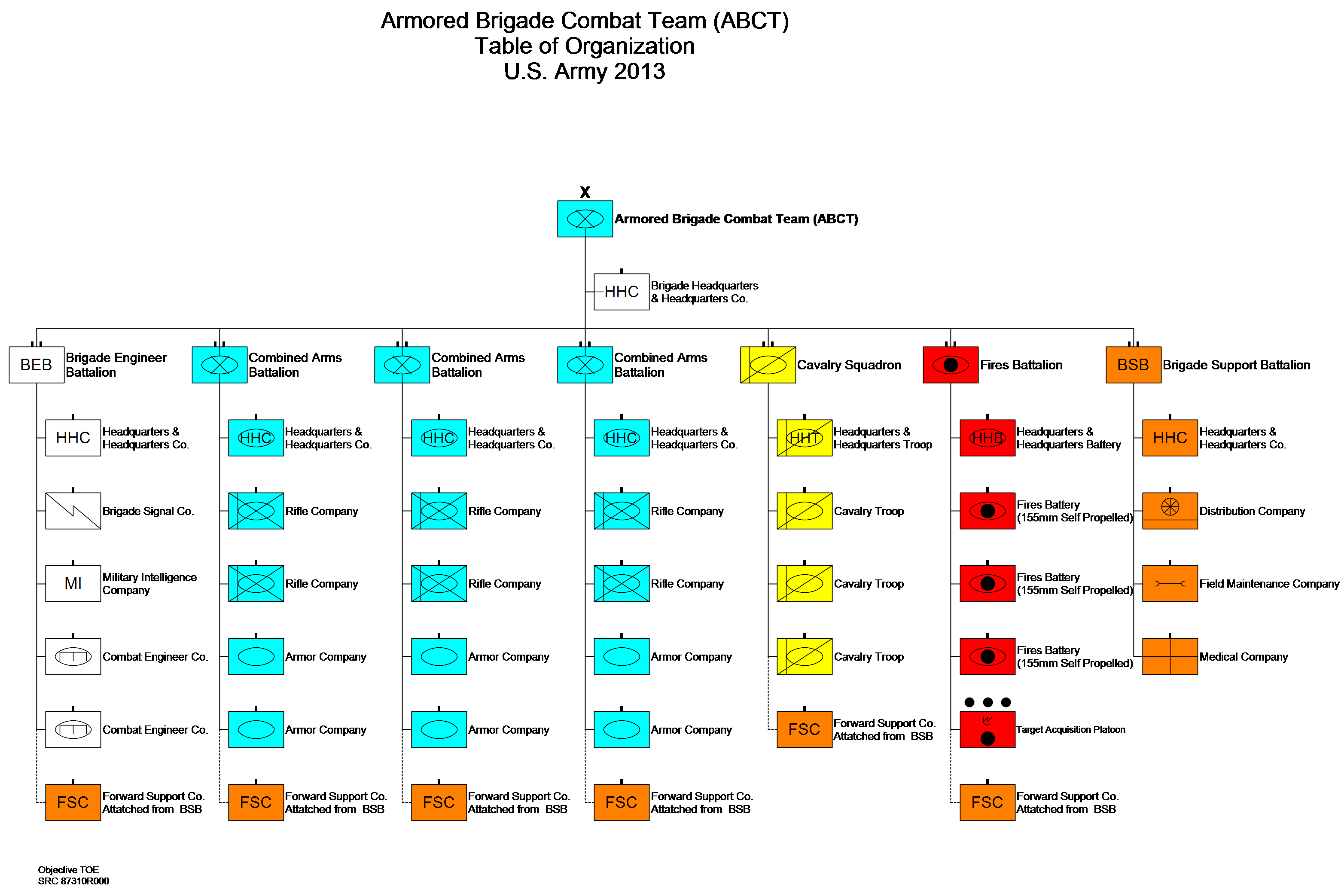
Armored Brigade Combat Team table of organization

The Armored Brigade Combat Team (ABCT) is the Army's primary armored force. It is designed around combined arms battalions (CABs) that contain both M1 Abrams tanks and M2 Bradley infantry fighting vehicles (IFVs). Other vehicles, such as HMMWVs and M113 armored personnel carrier, operate in a supporting role. In the future, it will also contain vehicles from the Armored Multi-Purpose Vehicle and likely the Optionally Manned Fighting Vehicle (OMFV) programs.

An Armored Brigade Combat Team consists of seven battalions: three combined arms battalions, one cavalry (reconnaissance) squadron, one artillery battalion, one engineer battalion and one brigade support battalion. As of 2014, the Armored Brigade Combat Team is the largest Brigade Combat Team formation with 4,743 soldiers. Prior to 2012, the Armored Brigade Combat Team was named the heavy Brigade Combat Team.

An ABCT includes 87 Abrams, 152 Bradley IFVs, 18 M109 self-propelled howitzers and 45 armed M113 vehicles. The operational cost for these combat systems is $66,735 per mile. The range of the Abrams limits the brigade to 330 km (205 miles), requiring fuel every 12 hours. The brigade can self-transport 738,100 L (195,000 gallons) of fuel, which is transported by 15 19,000 L (5,000 gal) M969A1 tankers and 48 9,500 L (2,500 gal) M978 tankers.

Prior to 2016, the CAB contained two tank companies and two mechanized infantry companies. In 2016, the CAB was reorganized to have two variations: an "armored battalion" biased towards armor, with two tank companies and one mechanized infantry company; and a "mechanized infantry" battalion biased towards infantry, with two mechanized infantry companies and one tank company. The ABCTs thus adopted a "triangle" structure of two armored battalions and one mechanized infantry battalion. This resulted in an overall reduction of two mechanized infantry companies; the deleted armored company was reflagged to the cavalry squadron.

In 2021 the US Army announced its Waypoint 2028 program which saw the force begin to shift its doctrinal and organizational focus towards what it called Large Scale Combat Operations (LSCO). The shift away from counter insurgency and to combat with a near peer threat meant a shift away from an organization focused on Brigade Combat Teams and back to one focused on the division echelon and above. Armored Brigade Combat Teams received some of the most sweeping changes to their organization as their parent divisions were reorganized to be the central component in any attack. In January 2022 the Army would rebrand from Waypoint 2028 to Army 2030 which would bring about refinements to the proposed organizational and doctrinal changes. In April 2023 the Army would release its newly formed divisional templates and BCT organizations.

The new Armored Brigade Combat Teams would retain their three maneuver battalions in the post-2016 structure of two armor-heavy battalions and one infantry-heavy battalion. Armored brigades will lose their own organic cavalry squadron which will be passed up to the divisional level in a new cavalry regiment. In lieu of this brigade headquarters will receive a 6 Bradley recon platoon. Armored brigades will also have their organic artillery shifted up to the divisional level so that they can be more effectively concentrated across the entire engagement front. Finally the organic engineering battalion will be shifted up to a division level engineering brigade so that it too can be more effectively concentrated to the main effort brigade when needed.

=== Post-2023 organizational restructure for combined armor/infantry assets ===
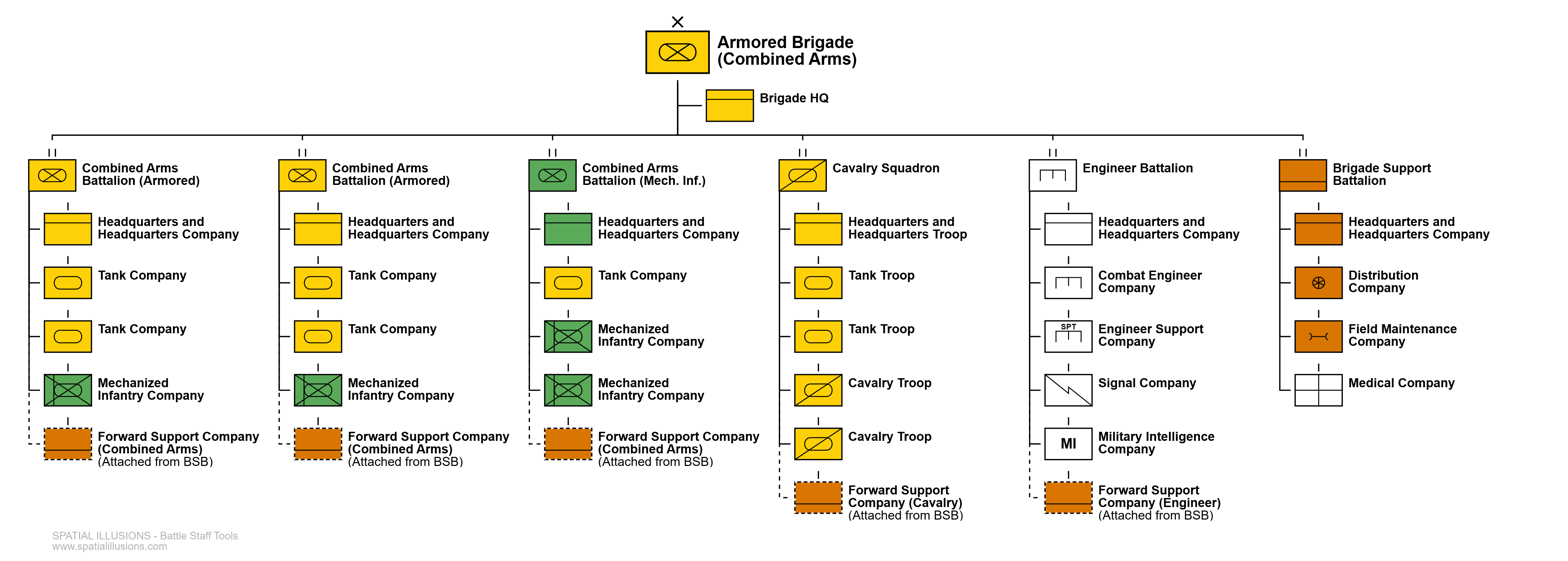
US Armored Brigade (Combined Arms) ORBAT

==== Armored battalion (×2) ====
- Headquarters and Headquarters Company
- Tank Company (×2)
- Mechanized Infantry Company

==== Mechanized infantry battalion ====
- Headquarters and Headquarters Company
- Tank Company
- Mechanized Infantry Company (×2)

==== Cavalry squadron ====
- Headquarters and Headquarters Troop
- Tank Troop (×1)
- Cavalry Troop (x3)

==== Field artillery battalion ====
- Headquarters and headquarters battery
  - Target acquisition platoon
- M109A7 Paladin 155 mm self propelled howitzer battery (×3)

==== Brigade engineer battalion ====
- Headquarters and headquarters company
- Combat engineer company
- Engineer support company
- Signal company
- Military intelligence company

==== Brigade Support Battalion ====
- Headquarters and headquarters company
- Distribution company
- Field maintenance company
- Medical company
  - Headquarters platoon
  - Treatment platoon
  - Medical evacuation platoon
- Forward support company (cavalry)
- Forward support company (engineer)
- Forward support company (Field Artillery)
- Forward support company (Combined Arms) (×3)

== Mobile Brigade Combat Team ==
In September 2025, the Army announced it will convert 25 IBCT (Infantry Brigade Combat Teams) into Mobile Brigade Combat Teams (MBCT) by 2028 as part of Chief of Staff Gen. Randy George's “Transforming in Contact” initiative. The conversion includes adding a multifunctional reconnaissance company and a multipurpose company to bring artillery and strike capabilities (drones and loitering munitions) to the Brigade level.

The MBCT brigades would also feature the M1301 Infantry Squad Vehicle (ISV). The vehicle, based on the Chevrolet Colorado ZR2 can be quickly delivered by helicopter in a dispersed area.

The 101st Airborne Division 2nd Brigade Combat Team, is the first brigade transitioning to a Mobile Brigade Combat Team. In June 2025 it was announced that the 116th Infantry Brigade Combat Team of the Virginia National Guard and the 76th Infantry Brigade Combat Team of the Indiana National Guard would become the first two ARNG MBCTs.

== Modernization ==
The U.S. Army planned to implement elements of the BCT Modernization program in 2010. This program was planned to utilize elements from the Future Combat Systems program that was canceled in early 2009.

The program came in two segments. The first to be implemented would be the Early Infantry Brigade Combat Team Capability Package (Early IBCT Package), which would modernize Infantry Brigade Combat Teams. The second to be implemented would be the Follow-on Incremental Capabilities Package, which could modernize all brigades.

=== 2013 Reorganization ===
After the 2013 reform's round of de-activations and downsizing, the below numbers represent the number of BCTs that were left in the US Army's Active Component. (Numbers after the brigade re-organization in brackets)

Combat brigades: 45 (32)

- 17 (10) Armored Brigade Combat Teams
- 8 (8) Stryker Brigade Combat Teams
- 20 (14) Infantry Brigade Combat Teams including airborne IBCTs

In July 2015, the Army announced the reduction of 2 additional BCTs as part of ongoing reductions to an end strength of 450,000. In addition to the reduction, one active Stryker BCT will convert to an infantry BCT, and its vehicles will be used to convert an Army National Guard BCT from armored to Stryker.

In April 2017, the Army confirmed that the proposed downsizing of 4/25 (Airborne) BCT was being reversed, and the BCT retained.

As of September 2018, the active duty component of United States Army consists of 31 Brigade Combat Teams:

- 14 Infantry Brigade Combat Teams (including airborne brigades)
- 11 Armored Brigade Combat Teams
- 6 Stryker Brigade Combat Teams

On 20 September 2018, the Army announced that the 1st Brigade Combat Team of the 1st Armored Division (1/1 AD) stationed at Fort Bliss, Texas, will convert from a Stryker Brigade Combat Team (SBCT) to an Armored Brigade Combat Team (ABCT); and the 2nd Brigade Combat Team of the 4th Infantry Division (2/4 ID) stationed at Fort Carson, Colorado, will convert from an Infantry Brigade Combat Team (IBCT) to a SBCT. The conversion of the 1st Brigade Combat Team, 1st Armored Division, and the 2nd Brigade Combat Team, 4th Infantry Division, were planned to begin in the spring of 2019 and spring of 2020 respectively. With 25th Infantry Division Alaska's change to 11th Airborne Division in 2022, the Army will have one less Stryker Brigade and one more Infantry brigade, changing the total to 15 IBCTs and 6 SBCTs.

Army National Guard Brigade Combat Teams have the same TOE as active duty component BCTs. As of September 2018, the Army National Guard consists of 27 BCTs:

- 20 Infantry Brigade Combat Teams
- 5 Armored Brigade Combat Teams
- 2 Stryker Brigade Combat Teams

=== Further envisaged changes 2025-2029 ===
In February 2024, the Army announced upcoming changes to Army force structure (ARSTRUC 2025-29), which included Table of Organization and Equipment changes to some BCTs.

BCT changes included the deactivation of Reconnaissance, surveillance, and target acquisition (RSTA) cavalry squadrons for Infantry and Stryker BCTs in the Continental United States (CONUS). IBCTs and SBCTs based outside of CONUS have retained their RSTA squadrons. Simultaneously, division-level cavalry squadrons are planned to be activated. Also, heavy weapon companies in IBCT infantry battalions were downsized to weapon platoons within the battalion Headquarters and Headquarters Company. Artillery battalions were removed from the BCTs command and returned to Division Artillery (DIVARTY) control.

== See also ==
- Reorganization plan of the United States Army
- Regimental combat team
- USMC Marine Air-Ground Task Force, for comparison
