= Bernoulli =

Bernoulli can refer to:

== People ==
- Bernoulli family of 17th and 18th century Swiss mathematicians:
  - Daniel Bernoulli (1700–1782), developer of Bernoulli's principle
  - Jacob Bernoulli (1654–1705), also known as Jacques, after whom Bernoulli numbers are named
  - Jacob II Bernoulli (1759–1789)
  - Johann Bernoulli (1667–1748)
  - Johann II Bernoulli (1710–1790)
  - Johann III Bernoulli (1744–1807), also known as Jean, astronomer
  - Nicolaus I Bernoulli (1687–1759)
  - Nicolaus II Bernoulli (1695–1726)
- Elisabeth Bernoulli (1873–1935), Swiss temperance campaigner
- Hans Benno Bernoulli (1876–1959), Swiss architect
- Ludwig Bernoully (1873–1928), German architect
- Daniel Bernoulli (1936), Swiss geologist

== Mathematics ==
- Bernoulli differential equation
- Bernoulli distribution and Bernoulli random variable
- Bernoulli's inequality
- Bernoulli's triangle
- Bernoulli number
- Bernoulli polynomials
- Bernoulli process
- Bernoulli trial
- Lemniscate of Bernoulli
- Bernoulli, a journal published by the Bernoulli Society for Mathematical Statistics and Probability

== Science ==
- 2034 Bernoulli, minor planet
- Bernoulli's principle, or Bernoulli effect in fluid dynamics
- Bernoulli (crater), lunar crater
- Euler–Bernoulli beam theory, model of a bending beam

== Other ==
- Bernoulli Box, a removable disk storage system based on the Bernoulli effect
- Bernard Bernoulli, a character in the 1987 video game Maniac Mansion
- Francesco Bernoulli, a character in the 2011 animated film Cars 2
