= Nicolaus Bernoulli =

Nicolaus Bernoulli may refer to:

- Nicolaus Bernoulli (1623–1708), see Bernoulli family
- Nicolaus Bernoulli (1662–1716), see Bernoulli family
- Nicolaus I Bernoulli (1687–1759), Swiss mathematician
- Nicolaus II Bernoulli (1695–1726), Swiss mathematician
