= Nicolausian discounting =

Heuristic technique for simplifying decision-making

Nicolausian discounting is a heuristic technique meant to simplify decision-making involving very small probabilities by ignoring them. The term was coined by philosopher Bradley Monton in a 2019 paper. He defined it this way: "For decision-making, small probabilities should be discounted down to zero before maximizing expected utility."

Monton named the concept after Nicolaus I Bernoulli, who suggested it as a solution to his St. Petersburg paradox. Monton translates Bernoulli as writing in 1714 that "cases that have a very small probability must be neglected and assumed to be zero."

The term has gained some currency and been mentioned in other writings in philosophy.
