= Eadem mutata resurgo =

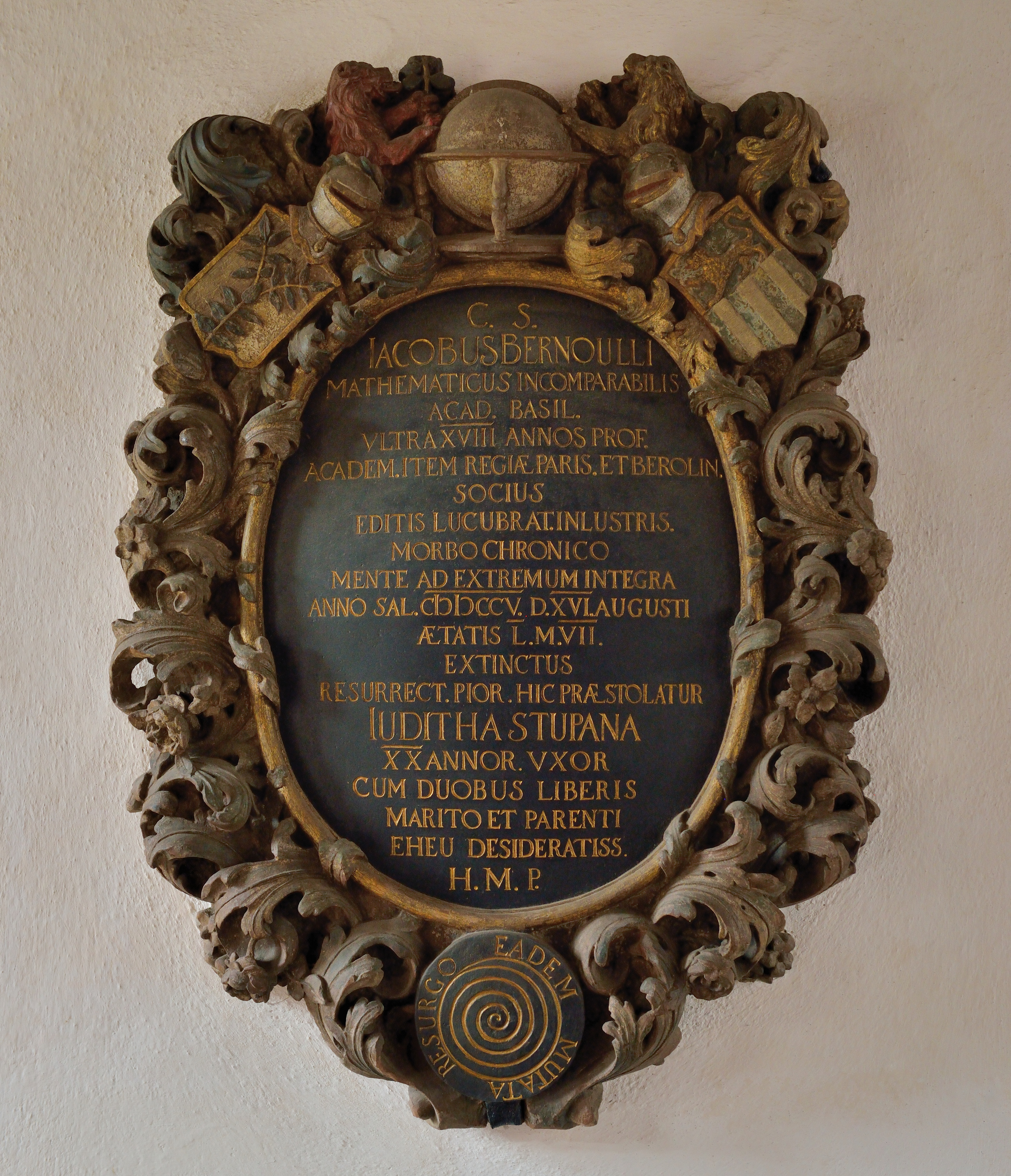

Eadem mutata resurgo is a Latin phrase that literally translates to "Although changed, I arise the same".

== Background ==
The word-for-word translation of the phrase is

"Same having-changed I-rise".
Eadem mutata resurgo.

The sense is better rendered in English as "I rise again changed but the same".

=== Jakob Bernoulli's tombstone ===
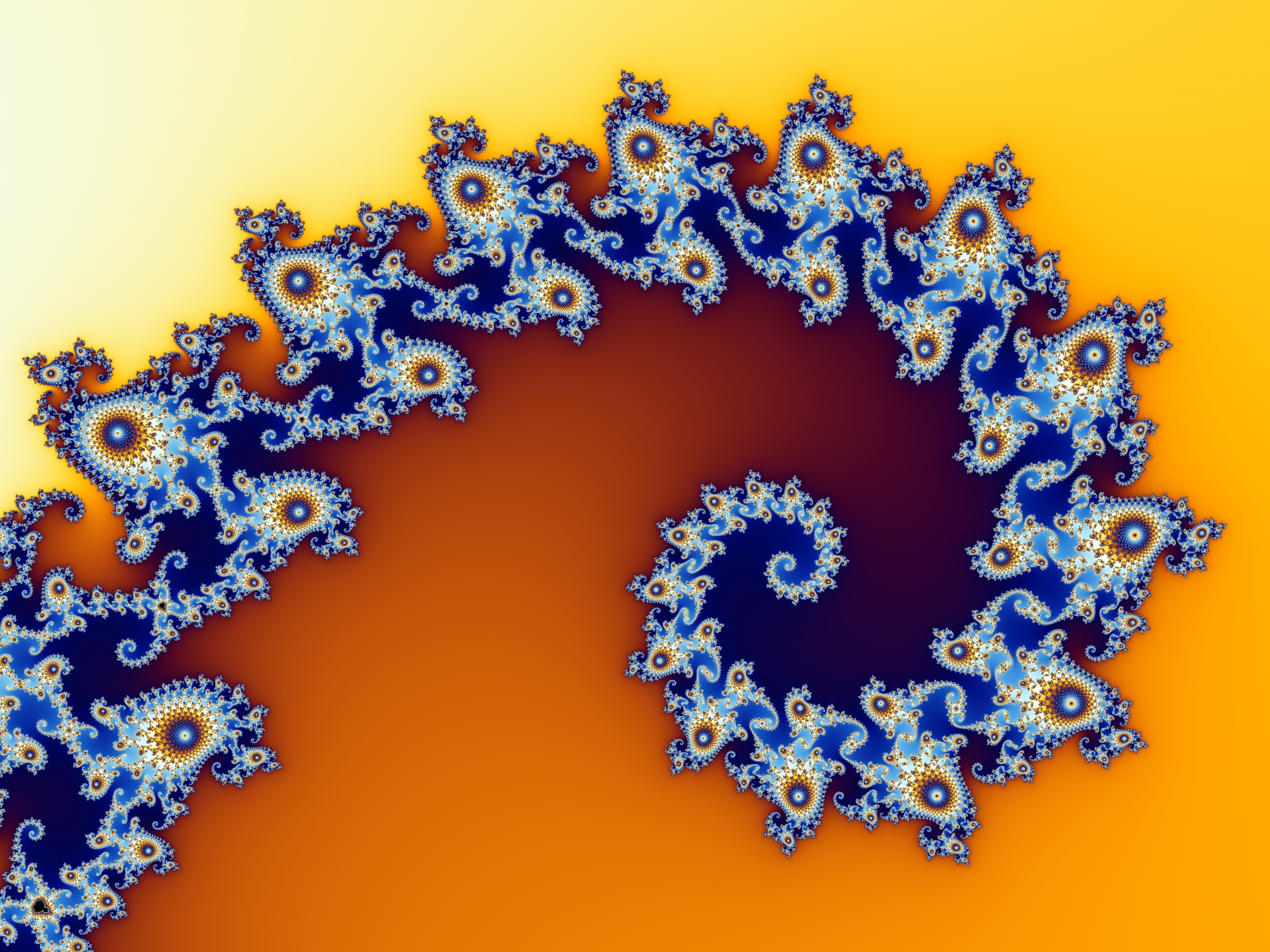
A "seahorse tail" section from the Mandelbrot set that follows a logarithmic spiral's shape.

The phrase was first known to be used by Jakob Bernoulli (1654-1705), a member of the famous Swiss mathematical family. He had studied logarithmic spirals during his life and directed for a spiral and the motto to appear on his tombstone in Basel. Bernoulli was referring to the fact that the logarithmic spirals are self-similar, meaning that upon applying any similarity transformation to the spiral, the resulting spiral is congruent to the original untransformed one.

The logarithmic spiral frequently appears in biology, such as with the curves of the Nautilus shell.

=== College motto ===
The College of St Hild and St Bede at the University of Durham adopted this phrase for its motto; it hangs in the Vernon Arms (the Vern).

It is also used as the motto of the Collège de 'pataphysique.
