= Bernoulli (crater) =

Crater on the Moon

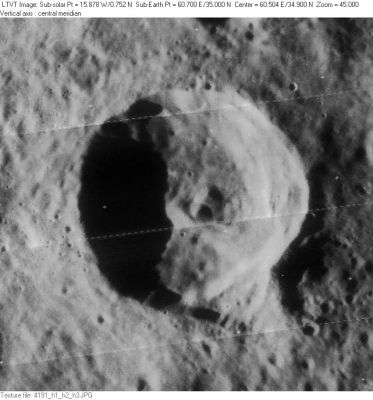
- Lunar Orbiter 4 image
- Coordinates: 34.93°N 60.61°E
- Diameter: 47.3 km (29.4 mi)
- Depth: 4.0 km (2.5 mi)
- Colongitude: 300° at sunrise
- Formation: Late Imbrian
- Eponym: Jacob Bernoulli; Johann Bernoulli

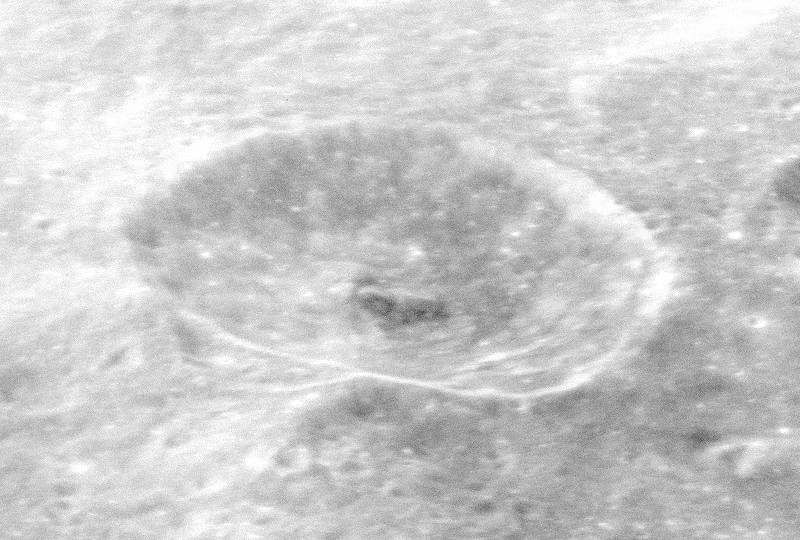
Oblique view from Apollo 16

Bernoulli is a lunar impact crater that is located in the northeast part of the Moon. It lies to the south of the crater Messala, and east of Geminus.

This formation dates to the Late Imbrian epoch of the lunar geologic timescale. It is nearly circular with several slight outward bulges around the perimeter. There is a sunken depression along part of the southern wall, forming an outward triangular bulge in the rim. The rim is highest along the eastern side, climbing to 4 km. At the midpoint of the crater floor is a central peak formation.

This crater is named after two Swiss mathematicians, Jacob Bernoulli (1654–1705) and Johann Bernoulli (1667–1748), both members of the Bernoulli family. Its designation was formally adopted by the International Astronomical Union in 1985.

== Satellite craters ==
By convention these features are identified on lunar maps by placing the letter on the side of the crater midpoint that is closest to Bernoulli.

Bernoulli	Latitude	Longitude	Diameter
A	36.4° N	60.9° E	22 km
B	36.9° N	65.6° E	22 km
C	35.3° N	67.2° E	19 km
D	35.7° N	66.5° E	12 km
E	35.3° N	63.0° E	26 km
K	36.7° N	62.7° E	20 km

== See also ==
- 2034 Bernoulli, minor planet
- Bernoulli family
