= Johann II Bernoulli =

Swiss mathematician and professor (1710–1790)

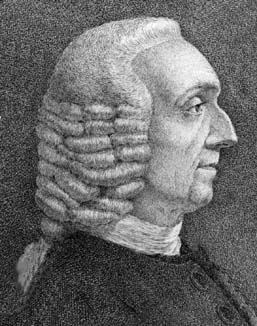
Johann II Bernoulli

Johann II Bernoulli (also known as Jean; 18 May 1710 in Basel – 17 July 1790 in Basel) was the youngest of the three sons of the Swiss mathematician Johann Bernoulli.

He studied law and mathematics, and, after travelling in France, was for five years professor of eloquence in the university of his native city. In 1736 he was awarded the prize of the French Academy for his suggestive studies of aether. On the death of his father he succeeded him as professor of mathematics in the University of Basel. He was thrice a successful competitor for the prizes of the Academy of Sciences of Paris. His prize subjects were the capstan, the propagation of light, and the magnet. He enjoyed the friendship of P. L. M. de Maupertuis, who died under his roof while on his way to Berlin. He himself died in 1790. His two sons, Johann and Jakob, are the last noted mathematicians of the Bernoulli family.

== Biography ==
Johann II Bernoulli was born on 18 May 1710 in Basel, the youngest son of Johann Bernoulli. He received private tuition from his father before reading jurisprudence at the University of Basel, graduating in 1729, and then undertook study tours in France and Switzerland to deepen his mathematical education.

In 1736 he won the Paris Academy prize for an essay on the propagation of light through an elastic aether, anticipating aspects of later wave theory. Further prizes followed in 1737 for optimising the design of ship anchors; in 1741 for the mechanics of capstans; and in 1743 for investigations into magnetic phenomena.

He was appointed professor of eloquence at Basel in 1743 and, on his father's death in 1748, succeeded him as professor of mathematics at the University of Basel. Although he published relatively little, Bernoulli maintained an extensive correspondence (around 900 surviving letters) with leading Enlightenment figures, including Émilie du Châtelet, Voltaire, and Pierre Louis Maupertuis, reflecting his high standing among contemporary scholars.

Bernoulli's lifelong friendship with Maupertuis began when he tutored the latter in Basel (1729, 1734 and 1739) and culminated in Maupertuis's death under Bernoulli's roof in October 1758, when Bernoulli also saw to his friend's final wishes. Through Maupertuis's influence he advised on the recruitment of Swiss scholars—such as Nicolas Béguelin, Daniel Passavant and Johann Bernhard Merian—to Frederick the Great's Royal Academy in Berlin, helping to shape its early membership.

Bernoulli died in Basel on 17 July 1790. His sons, Johann and Jakob, became the last prominent mathematicians of the Bernoulli family.

== Essay on light and sound propagation ==
Johann II Bernoulli's prize essay, awarded by the Académie des sciences in 1736, proposed that light travels as a pressure wave through an elastic medium (aether) composed of tiny particles and vortices. In an accessible one-dimensional model, Bernoulli represented the medium as a series of discrete masses separated by gas obeying Boyle's law, and showed that the forces between these masses follow the same form as those in a vibrating string. By applying the same mathematical framework used for string vibrations, he derived the speed of sound in gases, reproducing the formula obtained by Isaac Newton.

To address the known discrepancy between Newton's predicted speed and experimental values, Bernoulli introduced a modified "musical string" model in which each segment or "fibre" is shaped as a double cone with its widest parts at the ends. This adjustment yielded a higher calculated wave velocity—about 1.47 times Newton's result—though it overshot the correct factor. His father, Johann I, sent the essay to Leonhard Euler, who remained sceptical, while his brother Daniel Bernoulli later drew on related ideas to explain sound in flutes and conical pipes. Although the analogy to standing wave behaviour was incorrect for propagating waves, Johann II's work marks a notable early attempt to unify theories of light and sound propagation.
