= Ludwig Bernoully =

German architect

- Born: Christoph Ludwig Bernoully; 23 May 1873; Frankfurt am Main, Germany
- Died: 13 January 1928; Frankfurt am Main, Germany
- Occupation: Architect
- Parent(s): Anton Ludwig Bernoully; Anna Elisabetha Schott

Ludwig Bernoully (23 May 1873 – 13 January 1928) was a German architect. Most of his buildings were constructed in and around Frankfurt am Main, the city where he was born and where he died, suddenly.

He was a scion of a distinguished family of mathematicians and physicists: his ancestor Jacob Bernoulli had emigrated from Antwerp (at that time still controlled by Spain) in 1570, to Frankfurt, in order to escape a persecution campaign targeting the city's (Protestant) Huguenot minority.

Bernoully studied at the Städel Arts Institute in Frankfurt, at the Karlsruhe Institute of Technology (where he was taught by Carl Schäfer) and then at Stuttgart University. He then took a job in the office of Hermann Billing in Karlsruhe. Competition designs from this period survive, produced by Ludwig Bernoully and others, which were published in print in 1900.

By 1899 Ludwig Bernoully had settled in Frankfurt as a self-employed architect. He also taught for a time at the City Business Academy. His early style followed the Historicism popular at the time, but he later switched to Modernist architecture. His best known building is the "Haus der Technik" ("Technology Building") in Frankfurt's exhibition zone.

Between 1903 and 1906 Ludwig Bernoully employed as an assistant architect one of Germany's most important Bauhaus pioneers, Otto Haesler.
