= Jakob II Bernoulli =

Swiss physicist (1759-1789)

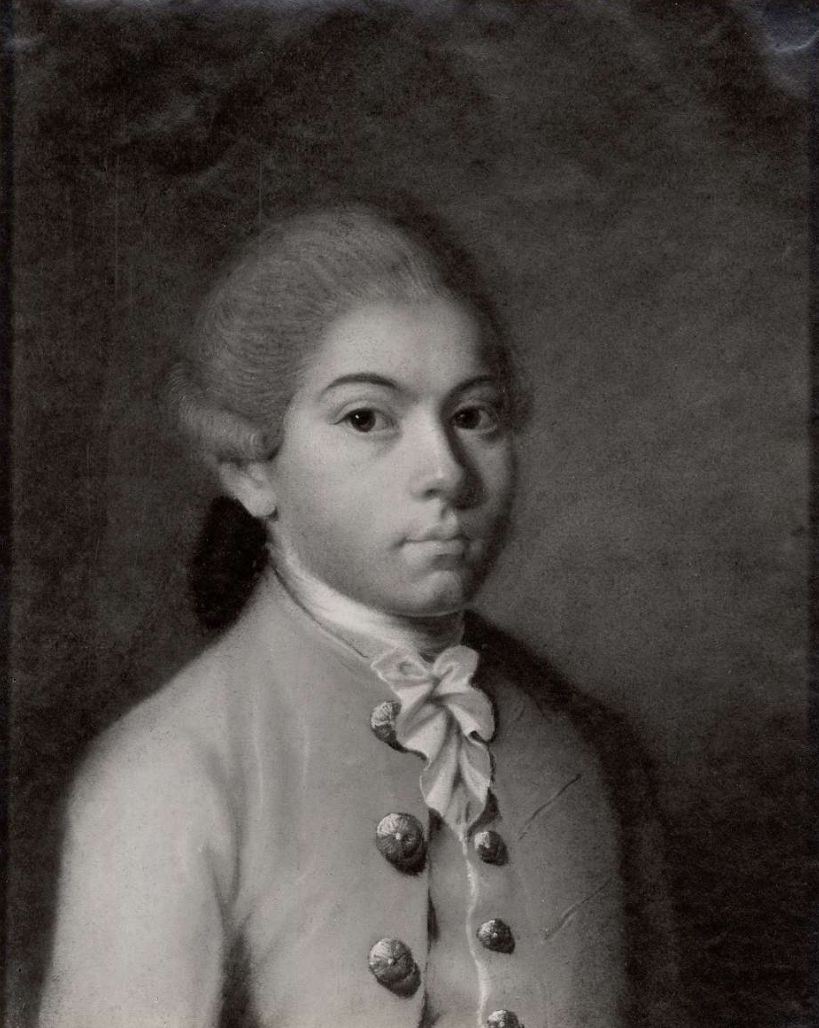
Jakob II Bernoulli.

Jakob II Bernoulli (17 October 1759, Basel – 3 July 1789, Saint Petersburg), younger brother of Johann III Bernoulli, was a Swiss physicist.

== Biography ==
Having finished his literary studies, he was, according to custom, sent to Neuchâtel to learn French. On his return, he graduated in law. This study, however, did not check his hereditary taste for geometry. The early lessons which he had received from his father were continued by his uncle Daniel, and such was his progress that at the age of twenty-one he was called to undertake the duties of the chair of experimental physics, which his uncle's advanced years rendered him unable to discharge. He afterwards accepted the situation of secretary to count de Brenner, which afforded him an opportunity of seeing Germany and Italy. In Italy, he formed a friendship with Lorgna, professor of mathematics at Verona, and one of the founders of the Società Italiana for the encouragement of the sciences. He was also made corresponding member of the royal society of Turin; and, while residing at Venice, he was, through the friendly representation of Nicolaus von Fuss, admitted into the academy of St Petersburg. In 1788, he was named one of its mathematical professors.

He drowned while bathing in the Neva in July 1789, a few months after his marriage to a granddaughter of Leonhard Euler.

Several of his papers are contained in the first six volumes of Nova Acta Academiae Scientiarum Imperialis Petropolitanae, in the Acta Helvetica, in the Memoirs of the Academies of Berlin and Turin, and in his brother Johann's publications. He also published separately some juridical and physical theses, and a German translation of Mémoires du philosophe de Merian.

He was one of the last notable members of the Bernoulli family.
