= Elisabeth Bernoulli =

Swiss temperance campaigner

Elisabeth Bernoulli (9 December 1873 – 22 February 1935) was a Swiss campaigner for temperance and against alcohol use.

== Biography ==
Bernoulli was born in Basel, Switzerland, the daughter of Theodor Bernoulli. The architect Hans Benno Bernoulli was her younger brother, and she was descended from the Bernoulli family of mathematicians.

She joined the Swiss Schweizerischer Bund abstinenter Frauen (BAF) (Association of Abstinent Women) at age 29. In 1907 she was elected to be president of the association's Basel branch and held that office until 1912. During this time she was employed, partly voluntarily, in the Swiss Zentralstelle zur Bekämpfung des Alkoholismus (Central Department for Combating Alcoholism).

In 1923 she was entrusted with the administration of the Secretariat and two years later she became president of the central Swiss BAF at Lausanne and held that office for four years.

From 1923 to 1933 she also edited Wegweiser zur Frauenarbeit gegen den Alkohol (Guide to women's work against alcohol).

She died in Basel on 22 February 1935, aged 61.

== Writing ==
- L'abstinence (1935)
- Wegweiser zur Frauenarbeit gegen den Alkohol [Guide to women's work against alcohol] (1922-33)
