= Daniel Bernoulli =

Swiss mathematician and physicist (1700–1782)

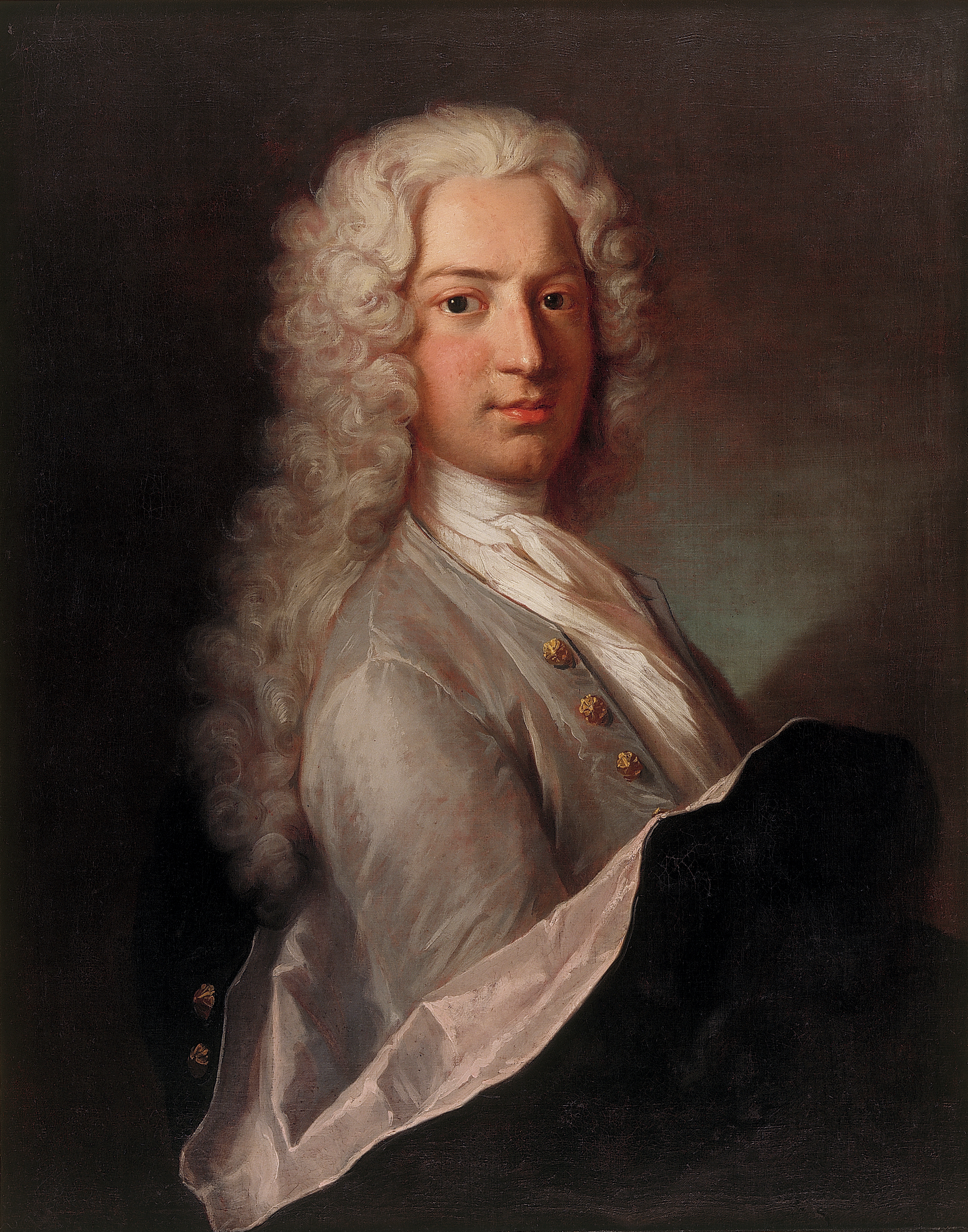
- Portrait, c. 1720–1725
- Born: 8 February 1700; Groningen, Dutch Republic
- Died: 27 March 1782 (aged 82); Basel, Republic of the Swiss
- Education: University of Basel (M.D., 1721); Heidelberg University; University of Strasbourg
- Known for: Bernoulli's principle Euler–Bernoulli beam theory Early kinetic theory of gases Gamma function St. Petersburg paradox Superposition principle Thermodynamics
- Scientific career
- Fields: Mathematics, physics, medicine
- Thesis: Dissertatio physico-medica de respiratione (Dissertation on the medical physics of respiration) (1721)

Daniel Bernoulli (Note: /bɜːrˈnuːli/ bur-NOO-lee; Swiss Standard German: [ˈdaːni̯eːl bɛrˈnʊli];) (8 February [O.S. 29 January] 1700 – 27 March 1782) was a Swiss mathematician and physicist and was one of the many prominent mathematicians in the Bernoulli family from Basel. He is particularly remembered for his applications of mathematics to mechanics, especially fluid mechanics, and for his pioneering work in probability and statistics. His name is commemorated in Bernoulli's principle, a particular example of the conservation of energy, which describes the mathematics of the mechanism underlying the operation of two important technologies of the 20th century: the carburetor and the aeroplane wing.

== Early life ==
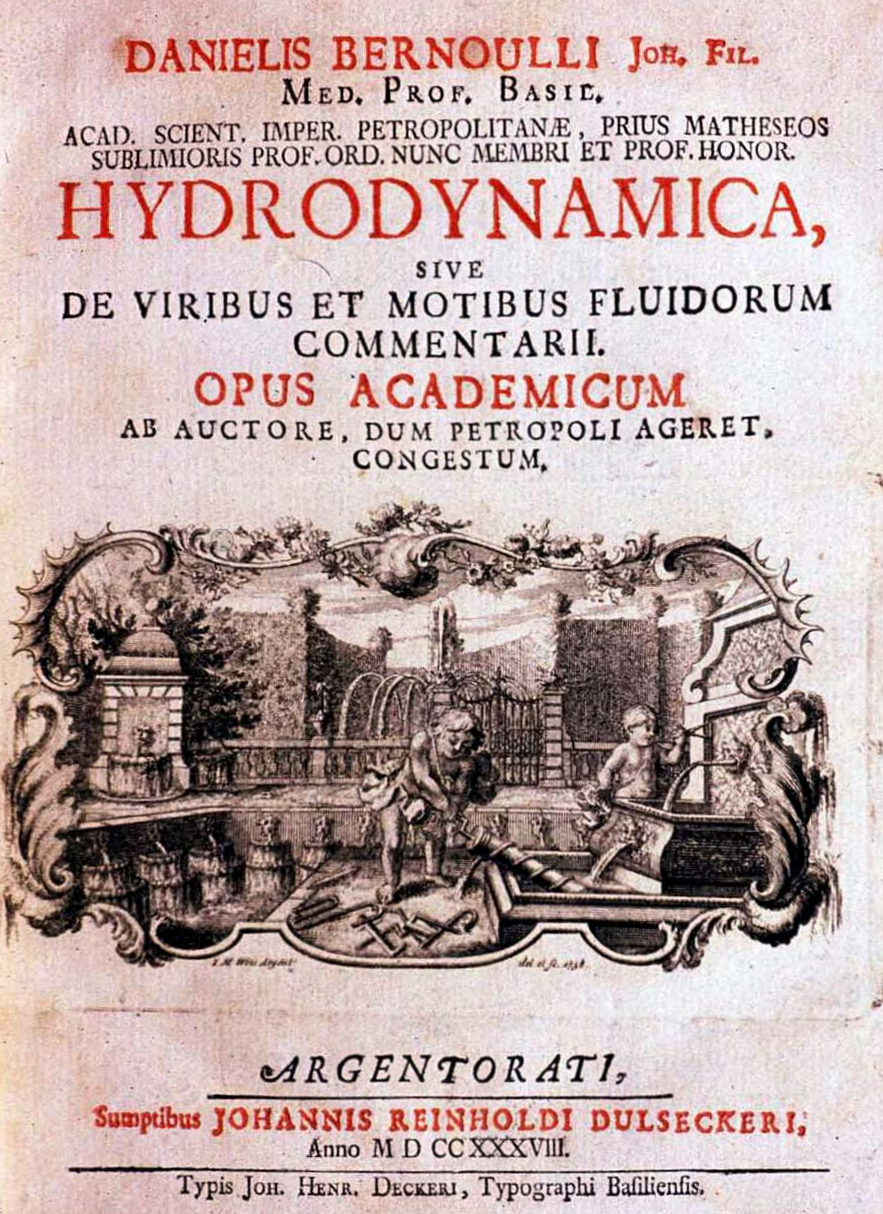
Frontpage of Hydrodynamica (1738)

Daniel Bernoulli was born in Groningen, in the Netherlands, into a family of distinguished mathematicians. The Bernoulli family came originally from Antwerp, at that time in the Spanish Netherlands, but emigrated to escape the Spanish persecution of the Protestants. After a brief period in Frankfurt the family moved to Basel, in Switzerland.

Daniel was the son of Johann Bernoulli (one of the early developers of calculus) and a nephew of Jacob Bernoulli (an early researcher in probability theory and the discoverer of the mathematical constant e). He had two brothers, Niklaus and Johann II. Daniel Bernoulli was described by W. W. Rouse Ball as "by far the ablest of the younger Bernoullis".

He is said to have had a bad relationship with his father. Both of them entered and tied for first place in a scientific contest at the University of Paris. Johann banned Daniel from his house, allegedly being unable to bear the "shame" of Daniel being considered his equal. Johann allegedly plagiarized key ideas from Daniel's book Hydrodynamica in his book Hydraulica and backdated them to before Hydrodynamica. Daniel's attempts at reconciliation with his father were unsuccessful.

When he was in school, Johann encouraged Daniel to study business citing poor financial compensation for mathematicians. Daniel initially refused but later relented and studied both business and medicine at his father's behest under the condition that his father would teach him mathematics privately. Daniel studied medicine at Basel, Heidelberg, and Strasbourg, and earned a PhD in anatomy and botany in 1721.

He was a contemporary and close friend of Leonhard Euler. He went to St. Petersburg in 1724 as professor of mathematics, but was very unhappy there. A temporary illness together with the censorship by the Russian Orthodox Church and disagreements over his salary gave him an excuse for leaving St. Petersburg in 1733. He returned to the University of Basel, where he successively held the chairs of medicine, metaphysics, and natural philosophy until his death.

In May 1750 he was elected a Fellow of the Royal Society.

== Mathematical work ==
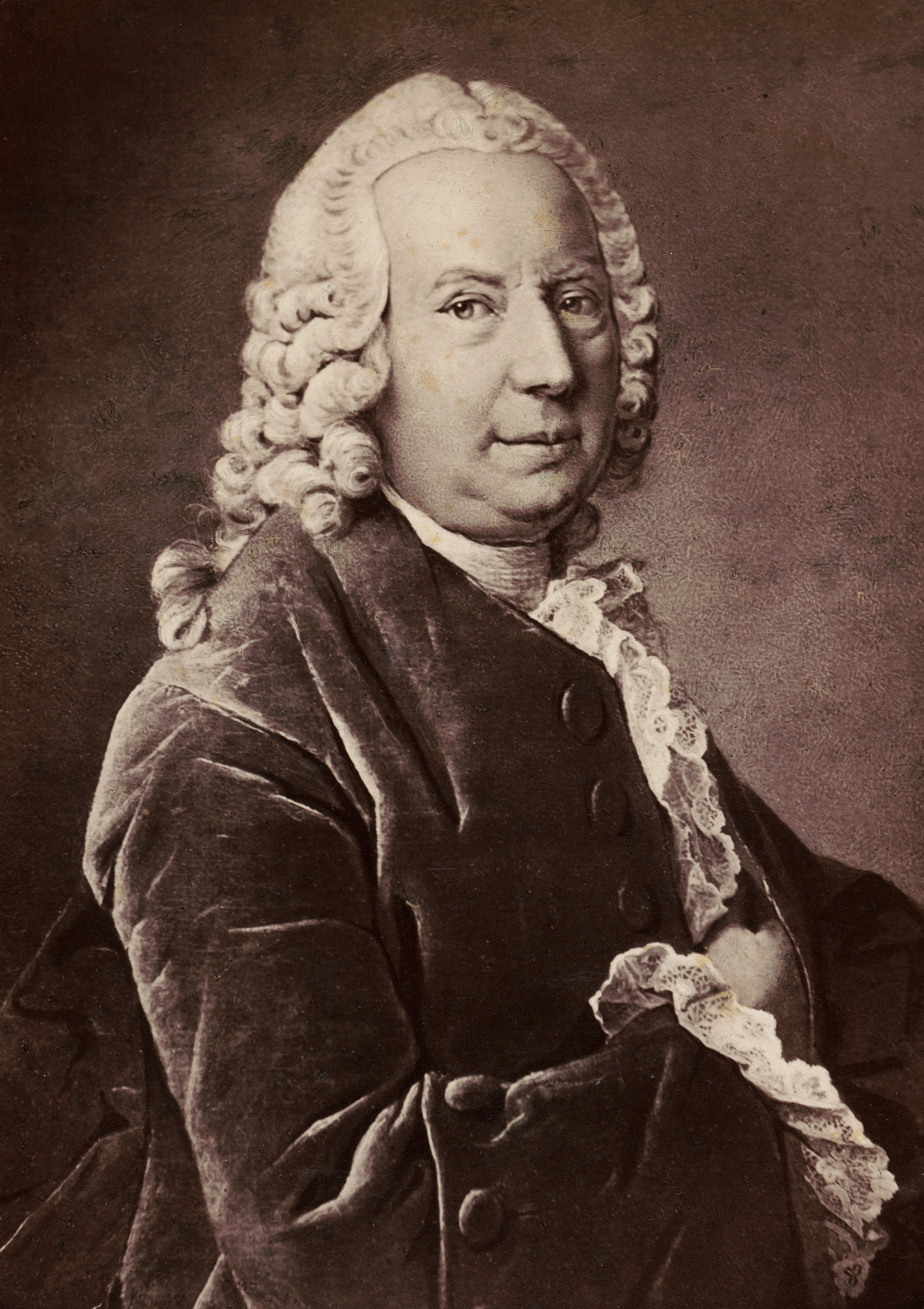
Daniel Bernoulli

His earliest mathematical work was the Exercitationes (Mathematical Exercises), published in 1724 with the help of Goldbach. Two years later he pointed out for the first time the frequent desirability of resolving a compound motion into motions of translation and motion of rotation. In 1729, he published a polynomial root-finding algorithm which became known as Bernoulli's method. His chief work is Hydrodynamica, published in 1738. It resembles Joseph Louis Lagrange's Mécanique Analytique in being arranged so that all the results are consequences of a single principle, namely, the conservation of vis viva, an early version of the conservation of energy. This was followed by a memoir on the theory of the tides, to which, conjointly with the memoirs by Euler and Colin Maclaurin, a prize was awarded by the French Academy: these three memoirs contain all that was done on this subject between the publication of Isaac Newton's Philosophiae Naturalis Principia Mathematica and the investigations of Pierre-Simon Laplace. Bernoulli also wrote a large number of papers on various mechanical questions, especially on problems connected with vibrating strings, and the solutions given by Brook Taylor and by Jean le Rond d'Alembert.

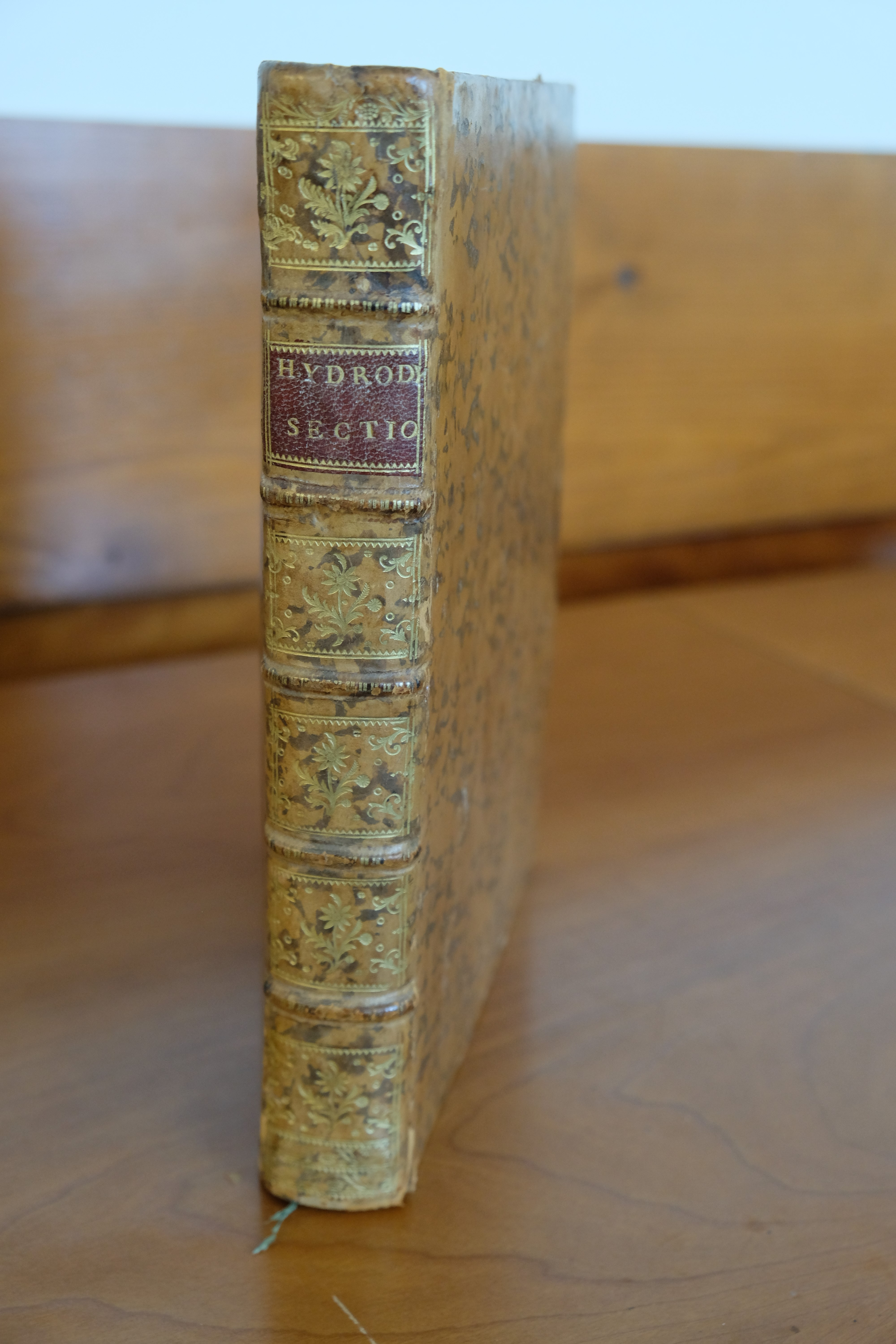
A 1738 copy of Bernoulli's Hydrodynamica

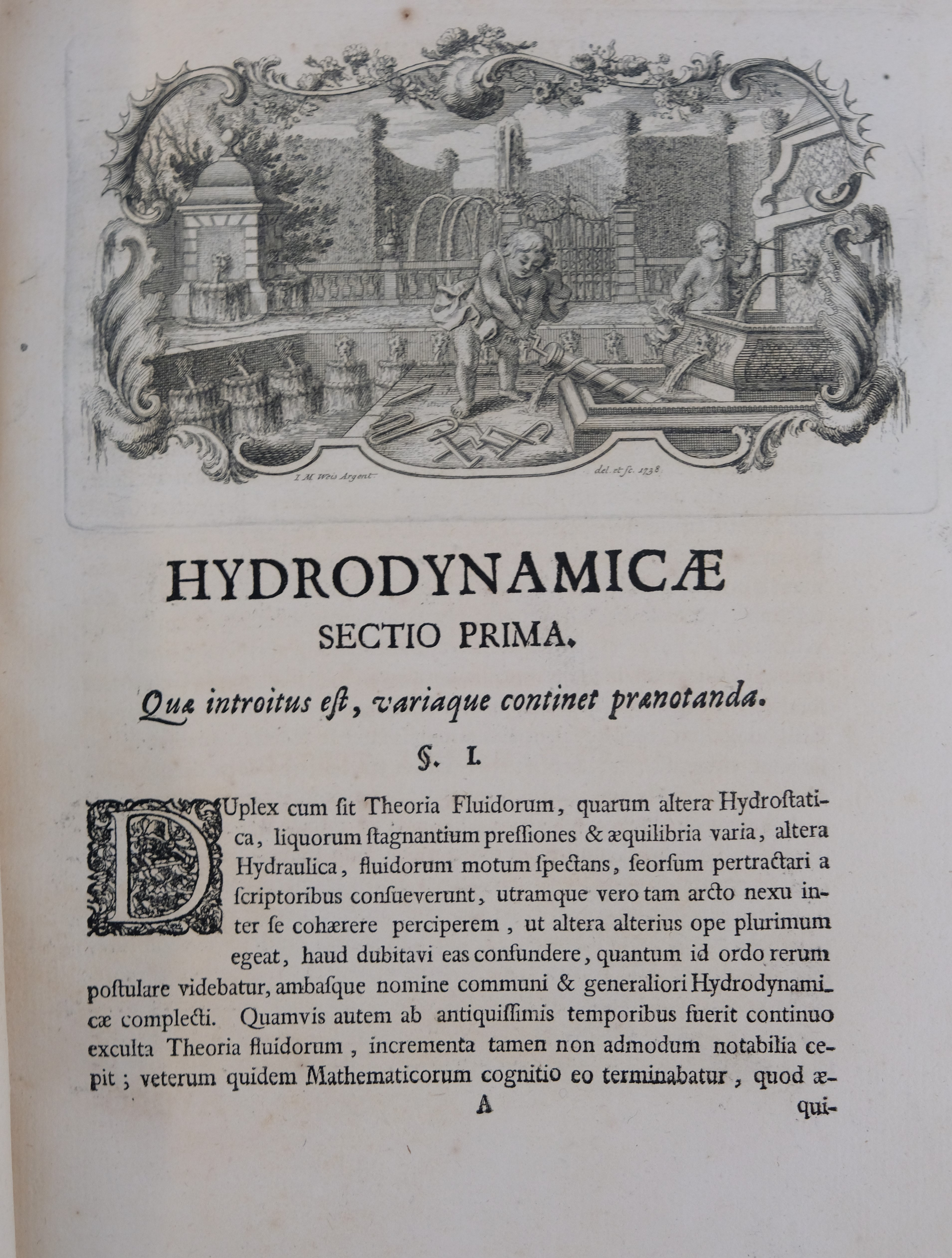
First page of the first section of a 1738 copy of Hydrodynamica

== Economics and statistics ==
In his 1738 book Specimen theoriae novae de mensura sortis (Exposition of a New Theory on the Measurement of Risk), Bernoulli offered a solution to the St. Petersburg paradox as the basis of the economic theory of risk aversion, risk premium, and utility. Bernoulli often noticed that when making decisions that involved some uncertainty, people did not always try to maximize their possible monetary gain, but rather tried to maximize "utility", an economic term encompassing their personal satisfaction and benefit. Bernoulli realized that for humans, there is a direct relationship between money gained and utility, but that it diminishes as the money gained increases. For example, to a person whose income is $10,000 per year, an additional $100 in income will provide more utility than it would to a person whose income is $50,000 per year.

One of the earliest attempts to analyze a statistical problem involving censored data was Bernoulli's 1766 analysis of smallpox morbidity and mortality data to demonstrate the efficacy of inoculation.

== Physics ==
In Hydrodynamica (1738) he laid the basis for the kinetic theory of gases, and applied the idea to explain Boyle's law.

He worked with Euler on elasticity and the development of the Euler–Bernoulli beam equation. Bernoulli's principle is of critical use in hydrodynamics.

According to Léon Brillouin, the principle of superposition was first stated by Daniel Bernoulli in 1753: "The general motion of a vibrating system is given by a superposition of its proper vibrations."

== Works ==
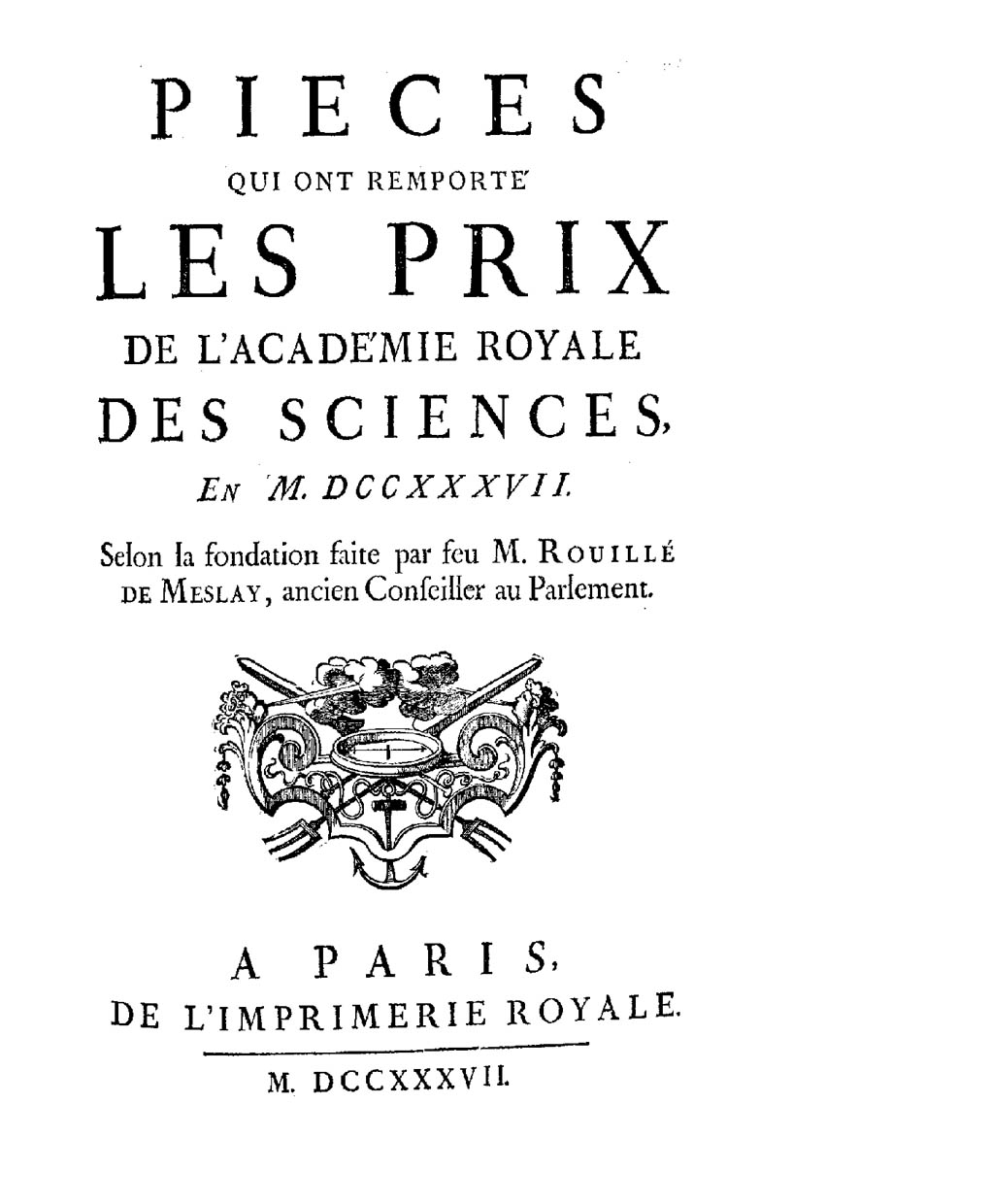
Pieces qui ont remporté le Prix double de l'Academie royale des sciences en 1737

- Pieces qui ont remporté le Prix double de l'Academie royale des sciences en 1737 (in French). Paris: Imprimerie Royale. 1737.

== Legacy ==
In 2002, Bernoulli was inducted into the International Air & Space Hall of Fame at the San Diego Air & Space Museum.

== See also ==
- Hydrodynamica
- Mathematical modelling of infectious diseases
- List of second-generation Mathematicians
