= Johann Bernoulli =

Swiss mathematician (1667–1748)

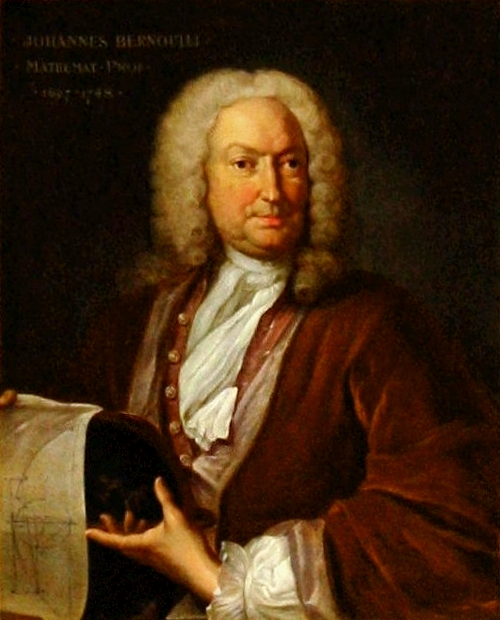
- Portrait by Johann Rudolf Huber, c. 1740
- Born: 6 August 1667; Basel, Switzerland
- Died: 1 January 1748 (aged 80); Basel, Switzerland
- Education: University of Basel (M.D., 1694)
- Known for: Development of infinitesimal calculus Catenary solution Bernoulli's rule Bernoulli's identity Brachistochrone problem Partial fraction decomposition Virtual work
- Scientific career
- Fields: Mathematics
- Workplaces: University of Groningen; University of Basel
- Thesis: Dissertatio de effervescentia et fermentatione; Dissertatio Inauguralis Physico-Anatomica de Motu Musculorum (On the Mechanics of Effervescence and Fermentation and on the Mechanics of the Movement of the Muscles) (1694 (1690))
- Doctoral advisor: Nikolaus Eglinger
- Other academic advisors: Jacob Bernoulli
- Doctoral students: Daniel Bernoulli; Johann Samuel König
- Other notable students: Leonhard Euler; Guillaume de l'Hôpital; Pierre Louis Maupertuis

Signature
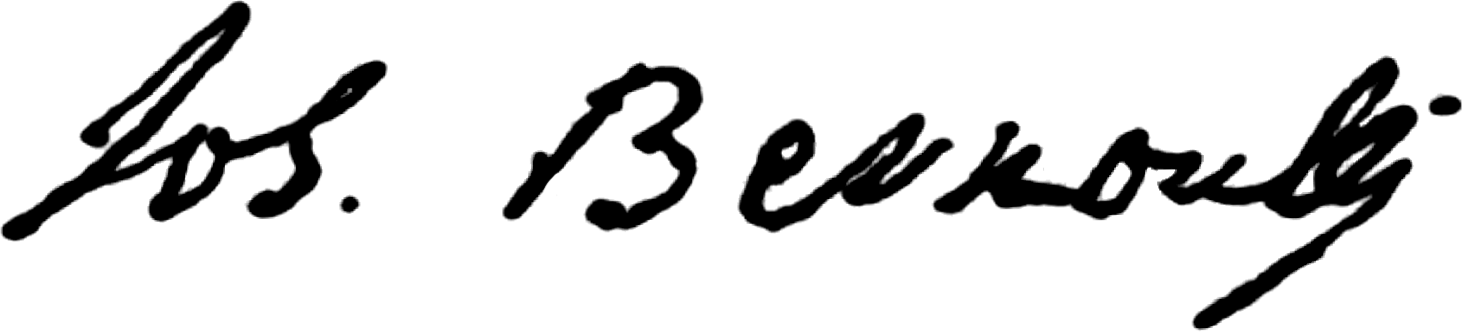

Notes
- Brother of Jacob Bernoulli; the father of Daniel Bernoulli, Nicolaus II Bernoulli, and Johann II Bernoulli; and the uncle of Nicolaus I Bernoulli.

Johann Bernoulli (Note: English: /bɜːrˈnuːli/ bur-NOO-lee; Swiss Standard German: [ˈjoːhan bɛrˈnʊli].) (also known as Jean in French or John in English; 6 August [O.S. 27 July] 1667 – 1 January 1748) was a Swiss mathematician and was one of the many prominent mathematicians in the Bernoulli family. He is known for his contributions to infinitesimal calculus and for educating the young Leonhard Euler.

== Biography ==
=== Early life ===
Johann was born in Basel, the son of Nicolaus Bernoulli, an apothecary, and his wife, Margaretha Schonauer, and began studying medicine at University of Basel. His father desired that he study business so that he might take over the family spice trade, but Johann Bernoulli did not like business and convinced his father to allow him to study medicine instead. Johann Bernoulli began studying mathematics on the side with his older brother Jacob Bernoulli. Throughout Johann Bernoulli's education at Basel University, the Bernoulli brothers worked together, spending much of their time studying the newly discovered infinitesimal calculus. They were among the first mathematicians to not only study and understand calculus but to apply it to various problems. In 1690, he completed a degree dissertation in medicine, reviewed by Gottfried Leibniz, whose title was De Motu musculorum et de effervescentia et fermentatione.

=== Adult life ===
After graduating from Basel University, Johann Bernoulli moved to teach differential equations. Later, in 1694, he married Dorothea Falkner, the daughter of an alderman of Basel, and soon after accepted a position as the professor of mathematics at the University of Groningen. At the request of his father-in-law, Bernoulli began the voyage back to his home town of Basel in 1705. Just after setting out on the journey he learned of his brother's death to tuberculosis. Bernoulli had planned on becoming the professor of Greek at Basel University upon returning but instead was able to take over as professor of mathematics, his older brother's former position. As a student of Leibniz's calculus, Bernoulli sided with him in 1713 in the Leibniz–Newton debate over who deserved credit for the discovery of calculus. Bernoulli defended Leibniz by showing that he had solved certain problems with his methods that Newton had failed to solve. Bernoulli also promoted Descartes' vortex theory over Newton's theory of gravitation. This ultimately delayed acceptance of Newton's theory in continental Europe.

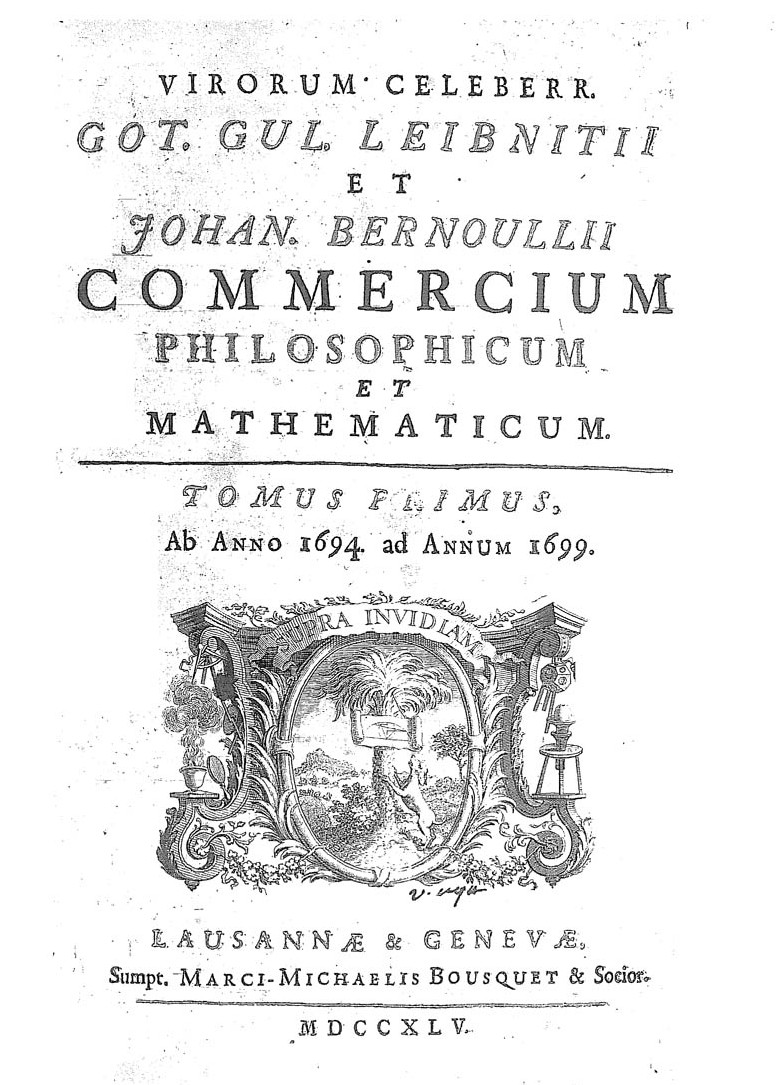
Commercium philosophicum et mathematicum (1745), a collection of letters between Leibnitz and Bernoulli

In 1724, Johann Bernoulli entered a competition sponsored by the French Académie Royale des Sciences, which posed the question:

What are the laws according to which a perfectly hard body, put into motion, moves another body of the same nature either at rest or in motion, and which it encounters either in a vacuum or in a plenum?

In defending a view previously espoused by Leibniz, he found himself postulating an infinite external force required to make the body elastic by overcoming the infinite internal force making the body hard. In consequence, he was disqualified for the prize, which was won by Maclaurin. However, Bernoulli's paper was subsequently accepted in 1726 when the Académie considered papers regarding elastic bodies, for which the prize was awarded to Pierre Mazière. Bernoulli received an honourable mention in both competitions.

=== Disputes and controversy ===
Although Johann and his brother Jacob Bernoulli worked together before Johann graduated from Basel University, shortly after this, the two developed a jealous and competitive relationship. Johann was jealous of Jacob's position and the two often attempted to outdo each other. After Jacob's death, Johann's jealousy shifted toward his own talented son, Daniel. In 1738 the father–son duo nearly simultaneously published separate works on hydrodynamics (Daniel's Hydrodynamica in 1738 and Johann's Hydraulica in 1743). Johann attempted to take precedence over his son by purposely and falsely predating his work six years prior to his son's.

The Bernoulli brothers often worked on the same problems, but not without friction. Their most bitter dispute concerned the brachistochrone curve problem, or the equation for the path followed by a particle from one point to another in the shortest amount of time, if the particle is acted upon by gravity alone. Johann presented the problem in 1696, offering a reward for its solution. Entering the challenge, Johann proposed the cycloid, the path of a point on a moving wheel, also pointing out the relation this curve bears to the path taken by a ray of light passing through layers of varied density. Jacob proposed the same solution, but Johann's derivation of the solution was incorrect, and he presented his brother Jacob's derivation as his own.

Bernoulli was hired by Guillaume de l'Hôpital for tutoring in mathematics. Bernoulli and l'Hôpital signed a contract which gave l'Hôpital the right to use Bernoulli's discoveries as he pleased. L'Hôpital authored the first textbook on infinitesimal calculus, Analyse des Infiniment Petits pour l'Intelligence des Lignes Courbes in 1696, which mainly consisted of the work of Bernoulli, including what is now known as l'Hôpital's rule. Subsequently, in letters to Leibniz, Pierre Varignon and others, Bernoulli complained that he had not received enough credit for his contributions, in spite of the preface of his book:

I recognize I owe much to the insights of the Messrs. Bernoulli, especially to those of the younger (John), currently a professor in Groningen. I did unceremoniously use their discoveries, as well as those of Mr. Leibniz. For this reason I consent that they claim as much credit as they please, and will content myself with what they will agree to leave me.

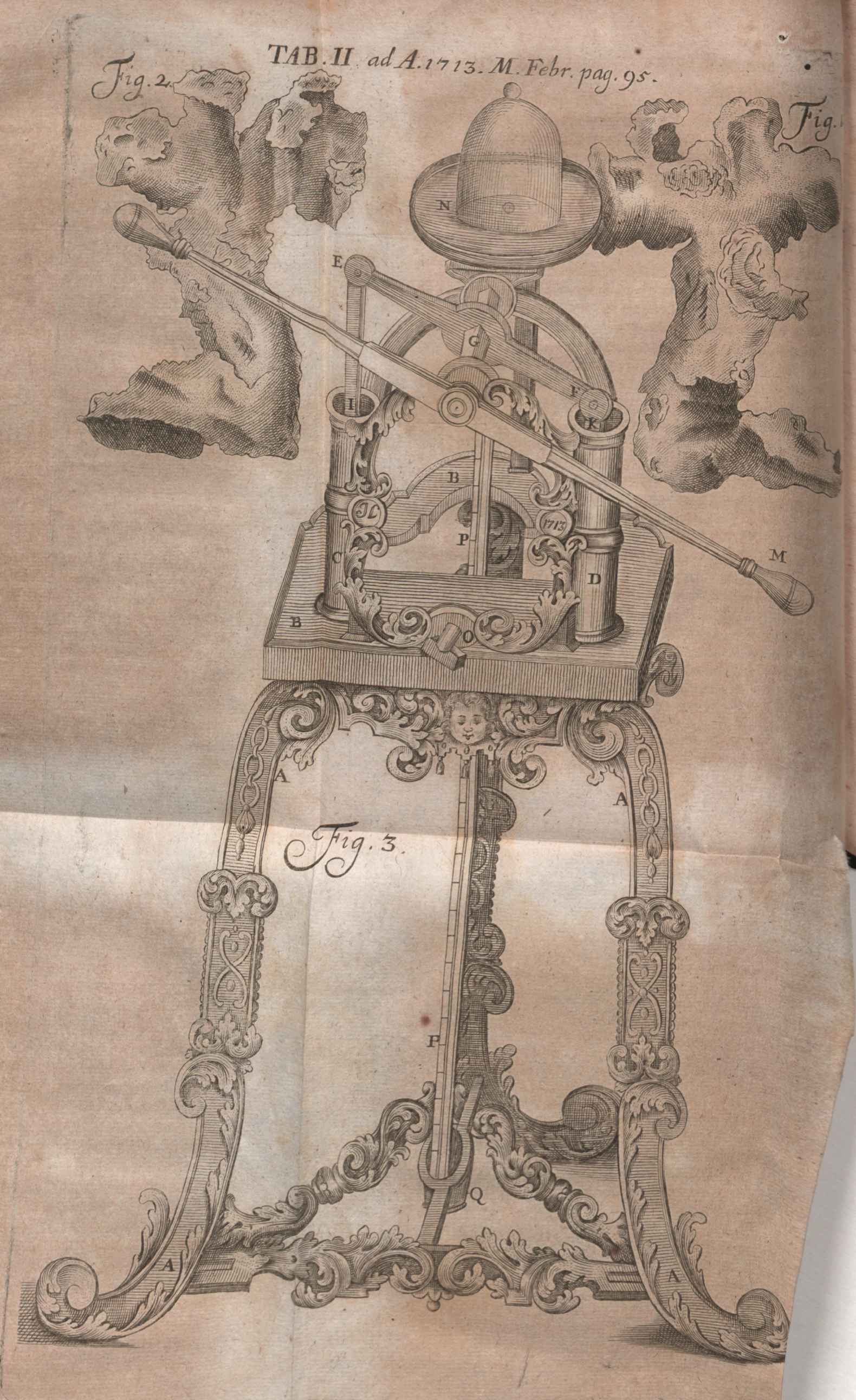
Illustration from De motu corporum gravium published in Acta Eruditorum, 1713

== Works ==
- De motu musculorum (in Latin). Venezia: Giovanni Antonio Pinelli & Almoro Pinelli. 1721.
- Recherches physiques et géométriques sur la question comment se fait la propagation de la lumière (in French). Paris: Imprimerie Royale. 1736.
- [Opere] (in French). Vol. 1. Lausanne: Marc-Michel Bousquet & C. 1742.
  - [Opere] (in French). Vol. 2. Lausanne: Marc-Michel Bousquet & C. 1742.
  - [Opere] (in French). Vol. 3. Lausanne: Marc-Michel Bousquet & C. 1742.
  - [Opere] (in French). Vol. 4. Lausanne: Marc-Michel Bousquet & C. 1742.
- Bernoulli, Johann (1786). Analyse de l'Opus Palatinum de Rheticus et du Thesaurus mathematicus de Pitiscus (in French). Parigi: sn.
- Bernoulli, Johann (1739). Dissertatio de ancoris (in Latin). Leipzig: sn.
- Bernoulli, Johann (1732). Hydraulica. Geneva, Switzerland: Marc-Michel Bousquet & C.
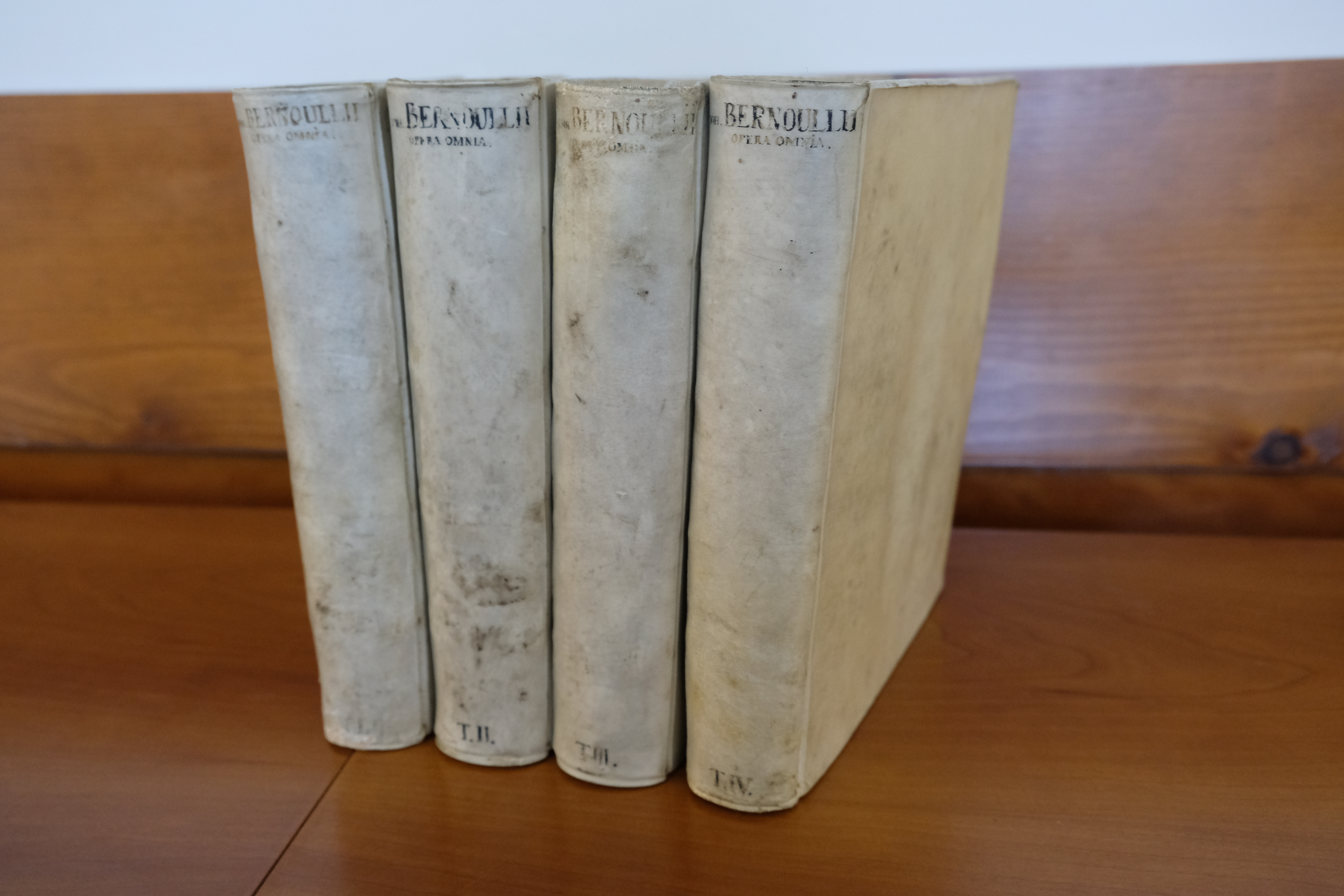
Volumes I-IV of Bernoulli's 1742 Opera Omnia

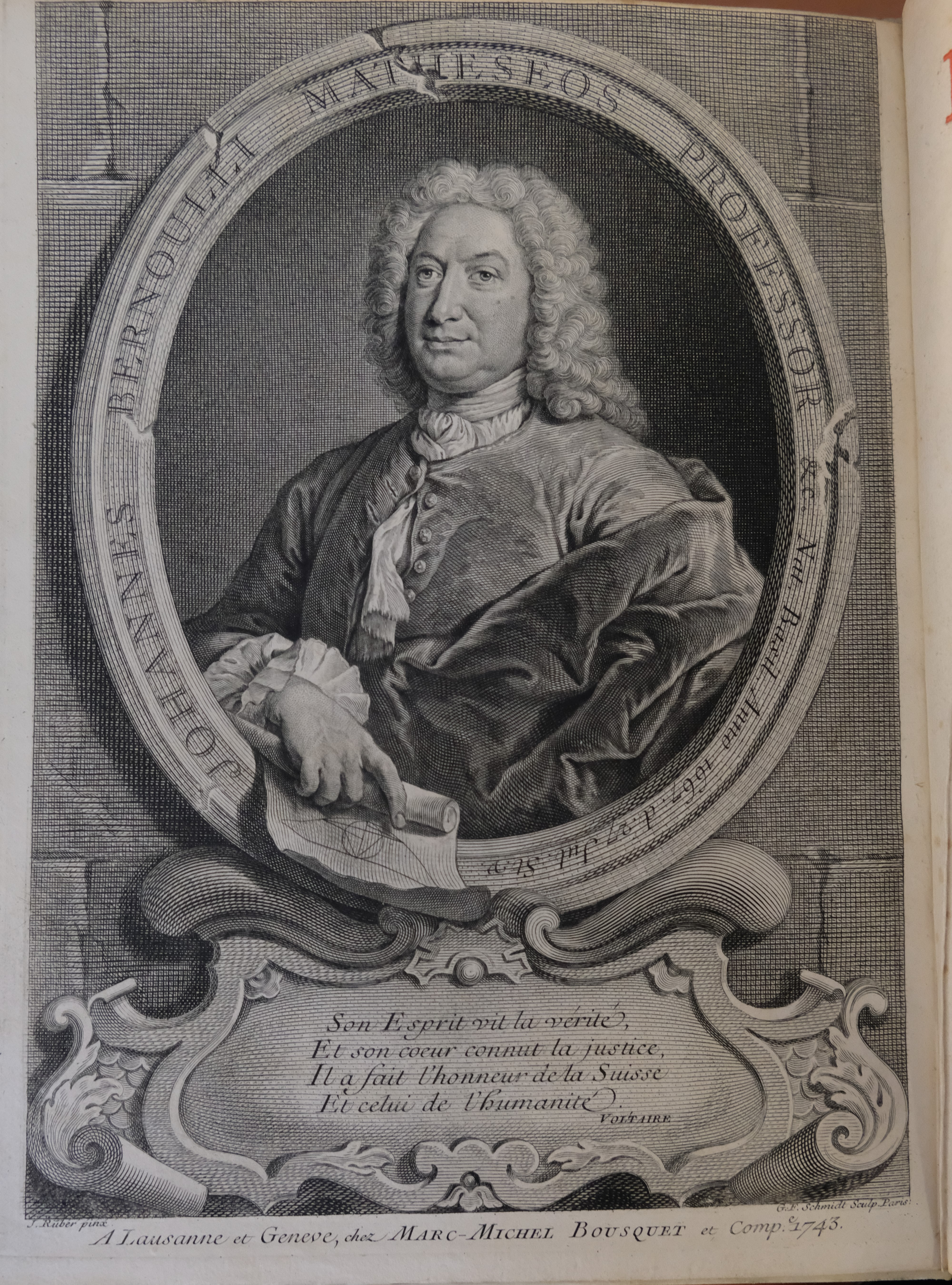
Portrait of Bernoulli in volume I of his 1742 Opera omnia

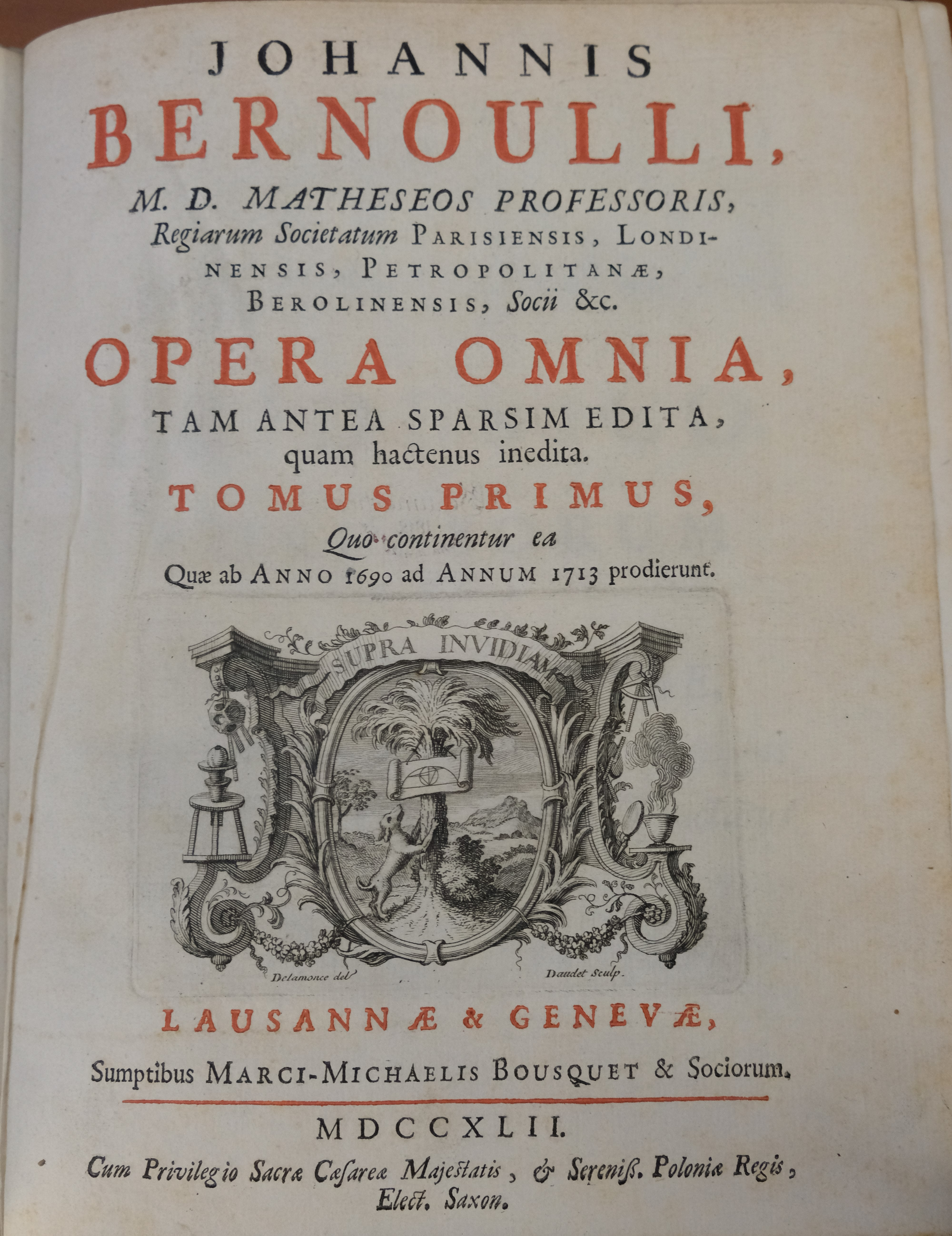
The front page of volume I of Opera omnia

== See also ==
- Sophomore's dream – a pair of analytical identities by Bernoulli
- Partial fraction decomposition
- List of second-generation Mathematicians
