= Bernoulli family =

Swiss patrician family

Bernoulli
- Current region: Basel, Switzerland
- Origin: Antwerp, Belgium
- Members: Jacob Bernoulli; Johann Bernoulli; Nicolaus I Bernoulli; Nicolaus II Bernoulli; Daniel Bernoulli; Johann II Bernoulli; Johann III Bernoulli; Jacob II Bernoulli
- Connected families: Curie family
- Distinctions: astronomy; geography; mathematics; natural sciences; physics

The Bernoulli family (/bɜːrˈnuːli/ bur-NOO-lee; German: [bɛʁˈnʊli]; (Note: German pronunciation from Mangold (1990). In a tradition going back to the 18th century, the name was spelled Bernouilli in France, and accordingly given the French pronunciation of [bɛʁnuji]. This is no longer the case, and the name is now spelled in the original form Bernoulli also in French-language context. Rue Bernoulli in Paris 8 was named rue Bernouilli in 1867 and renamed to the correct spelling in 1994 Bernoulli crater was spelled Bernouilli in the moon atlas by Beer & Mädler (1836), and hence adopted as the official name by the IAU in 1935; the IAU changed the official name to Bernoulli in 2003. The French submarine Bernouilli (1906) was named for Daniel Bernoulli.) Swiss Standard German: [bɛrˈnʊli]) of Basel was a patrician family, notable for having produced eight mathematically gifted academics who, among them, contributed substantially to the development of mathematics and physics during the early modern period.

== History ==
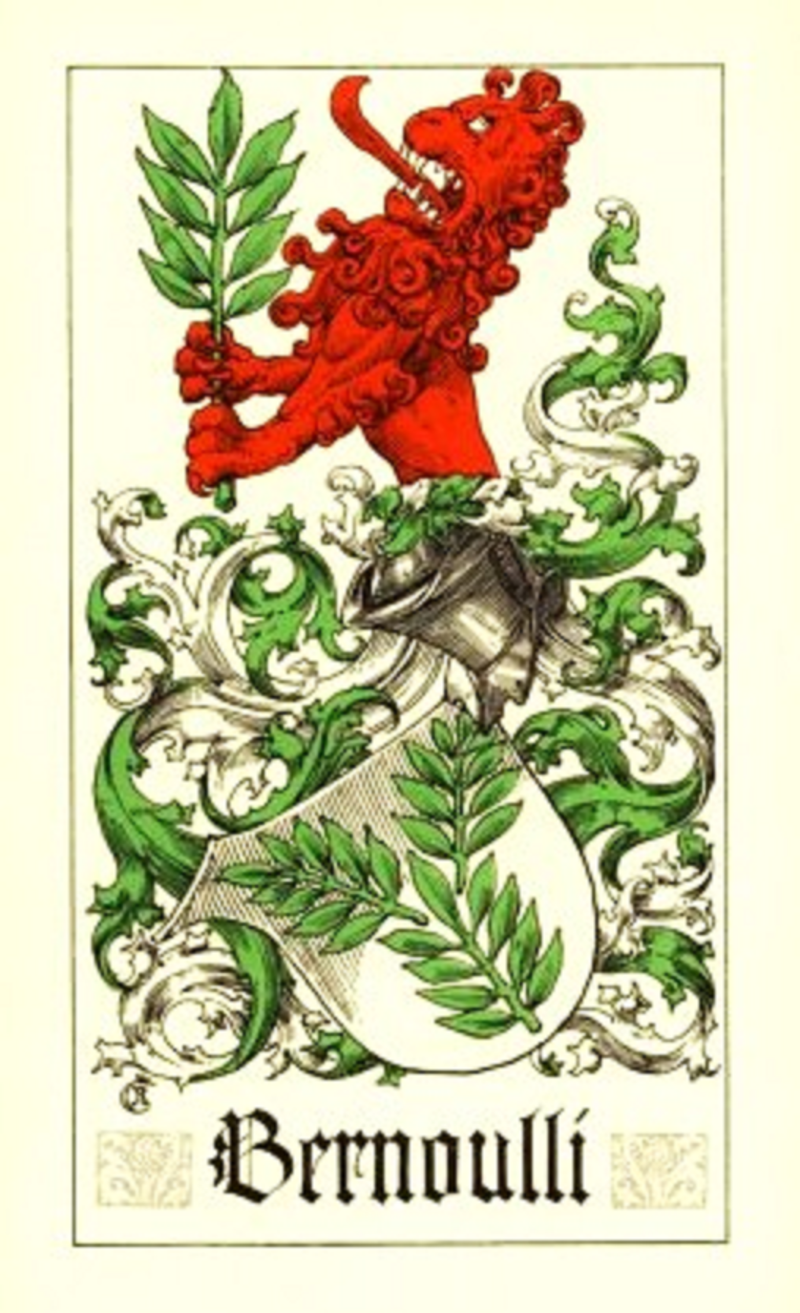
Coat of arms of the Bernoulli family

Originally from Antwerp, a branch of the family relocated to Basel in 1620. While their origin in Antwerp is certain, proposed earlier connections with the Dutch family of Italian ancestry called Bornouilla (Bernoullie), or with the Castilian family de Bernuy (Bernoille, Bernouille), are uncertain.

The first known member of the family was Leon Bernoulli (d. 1561), a doctor in Antwerp, at that time part of the Spanish Netherlands. His son, Jacob, emigrated to Frankfurt am Main in 1570 to escape from the Spanish persecution of the Protestants. Jacob's grandson, a spice trader, also named Jacob, moved to Basel, Switzerland in 1620, and was granted citizenship in 1622. His son, Niklaus Bernoulli (Nicolaus, 1623–1708), Leon's great-great-grandson, married Margarethe Schönauer.

=== Notable academic members ===
Margarethe and Niklaus had four sons, of whom Johann and Hieronymus became the progenitors of the "greater" and the "lesser" branches of the family, respectively. The four sons of Margarethe and Niklaus were: (Note: The academic members of the famous Bernoulli family lived in a multi-lingual country and themselves had regular correspondence and frequent professional and informal contacts with native speakers of German and French. The earlier Bernoulli brothers Jacob and Johann both published in Latin. Most of them spoke all three languages fluently, as well as occasional Italian, and other languages not local to Switzerland – Nicolaus and his nephew Johann both spoke some English, for example. They all appear to have comfortably and frequently used different versions of their names adapted to the language they were using at the moment (such as Jacob Bernoulli writing under the names "Jacob", "James", and "Jacques").)

- Jacob Bernoulli (1654–1705; also known as James or Jacques), mathematician after whom Bernoulli numbers are named, and author of the early probability text Ars Conjectandi
- Nicolaus Bernoulli (1662–1716), painter and alderman of Basel
- Johann Bernoulli (1667–1748; also known as Jean), mathematician and early adopter of infinitesimal calculus
- Hieronymus Bernoulli (1669–1760), m. Catharina Ebneter

In addition to Jacob and Johann, the Bernoulli family of mathematicians is generally taken to include:

- Nicolaus I Bernoulli (1687–1759), son of Nicolaus, mathematician, worked on curves, differential equations, and probability; originator of the St. Petersburg paradox
- Nicolaus II Bernoulli (1695–1726), son of Johann
- Daniel Bernoulli (1700–1782), son of Johann, developer of Bernoulli's principle and originator of the concept of expected utility for resolving the St. Petersburg paradox
- Johann II Bernoulli (1710–1790; also known as Jean), son of Johann, mathematician and physicist
- Johann III Bernoulli (1744–1807; also known as Jean), son of Johann II, astronomer, geographer and mathematician
- Jakob II Bernoulli (1759–1789; also known as Jacques), son of Johann II, physicist and mathematician

Several more recent prominent scholars are also descended from the family, including:

- Johann Jakob Bernoulli (1831–1913), art historian and archaeologist; noted for his Römische Ikonographie (1882 onwards) on Roman Imperial portraits
- Ludwig Bernoully (1873–1928), German architect in Frankfurt
- Hans Bernoulli (1876–1959), architect and designer of the Bernoullihäuser in Zurich and Grenchen SO
- Elisabeth Bernoulli (1873–1935), suffragette and campaigner against alcoholism

The surname survives in Switzerland, with 11 entries in the white pages for the city of Basel as of 2026.

== Family tree of the Basler Bernoullis ==
Niklaus (1623–1708)
Jakob I (1655–1705)	Nikolaus (1662–1716)	Johann I (1667–1748)	Hieronymus (1669–1760)
Nikolaus I (1687–1759)	Nikolaus II (1695–1726)	Daniel (1700–1782)	Johann II (1710–1790)	Franz (1705–1777)
Johann III (1744–1807)	Daniel II (1751–1834)	Nikolaus III (1754–1841)	Jakob II (1759–1789)	Hieronymus (1735–1786)
Christoph (1782–1863)	Johannes (1785–1869)	Leonhard (1786–1852)	Leonhard (1791–1871)	Nikolaus (1793–1876)	Johann Jacob (1769–1853)
Carl Christoph (1809–1884)	Carl Johann (1835–1906)	Eduard (1819–1899)	August (1839–1921)	Fritz (1824–1913)	Theodor (1837–1909)	Johann Jacob (1802–1892)	Franz (1813–1850)
Carl Christoph (1861–1923)	Carl Albrecht (1868–1937)	Eduard (1867–1927)	August Leonhard (1879–1939)	Maria (1868–1963)	Elisabeth (1873–1935)	Hans (1876–1959)	Rudolf (1880–1948)	Johann Jakob (1831–1913)	Carl Gustav (1834–1878)	Ernst (1846–1931)
Christoph (1897–1981)	Eva (1903–1995)	Lucas (1907–1976)	Eugen (1882–1983)
Cornelia Bernoulli (b 1954)

== Named for members of the family ==
- Bernoulli differential equation
- Bernoulli distribution
- Bernoulli number
- Bernoulli polynomials
- Bernoulli process
- Bernoulli trial
- Bernoulli's principle
- Bernoulli's triangle

== See also ==
- List of second-generation physicists
- List of second-generation mathematicians
