= Nicolaus I Bernoulli =

Swiss mathematician (1687–1759)

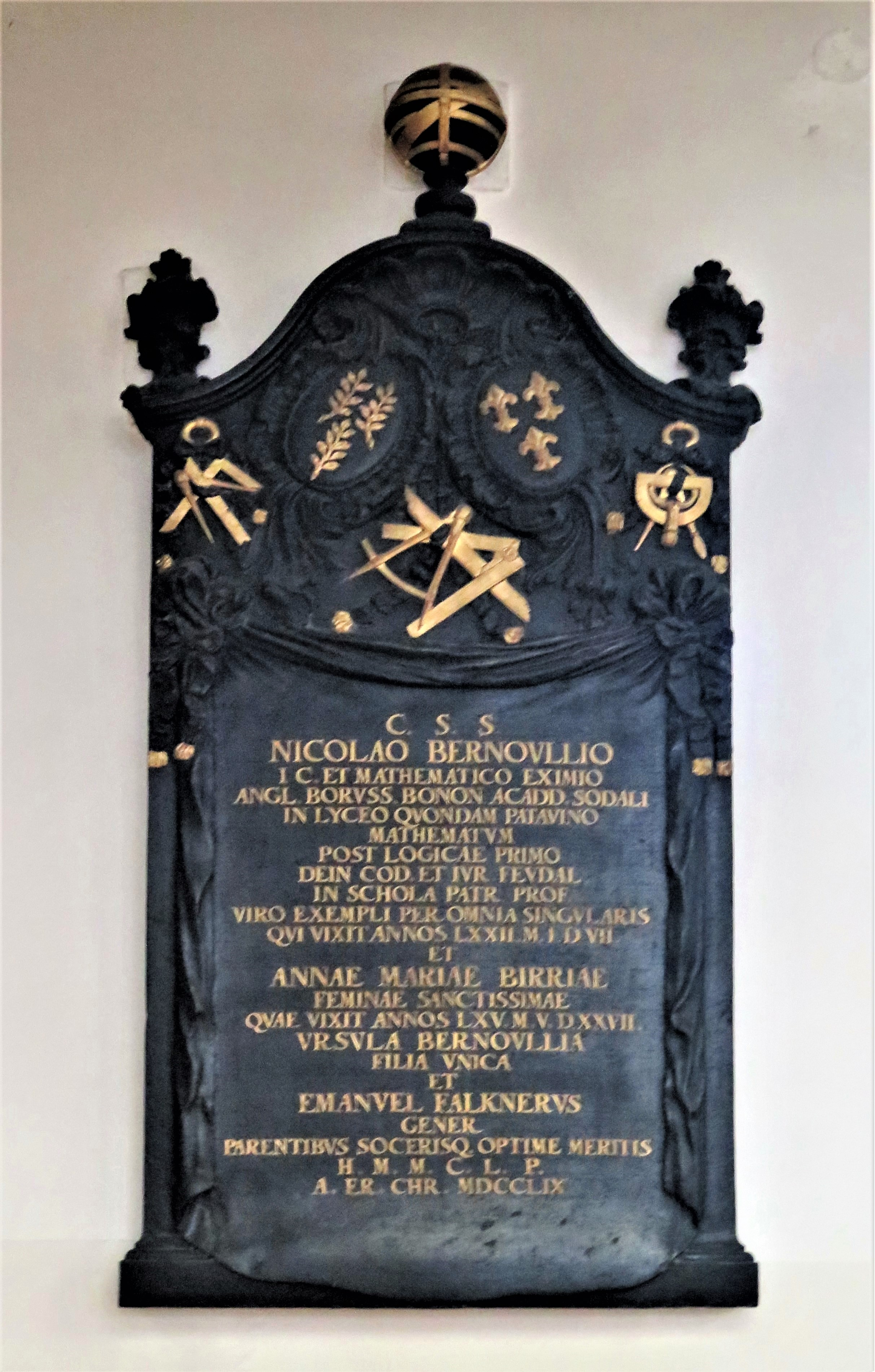
Epitaph for Nikolaus I Bernoulli in the Peterskirche (Basel)

Nicolaus Bernoulli (also spelled Nicolas or Nikolas; 20 October [O.S. 10 October] 1687 in Basel – 29 November 1759 in Basel) was a Swiss mathematician and was one of the many prominent mathematicians in the Bernoulli family.

== Biography ==
Nicolaus Bernoulli was born on 20 October [O.S. 10 October] 1687 in Basel. He was the son of Nicolaus Bernoulli, painter and Alderman of Basel. In 1704 he graduated from the University of Basel under Jakob Bernoulli and obtained his PhD five years later (in 1709) with a work on probability theory in law. His thesis was titled Dissertatio Inauguralis Mathematico-Juridica de Usu Artis Conjectandi in Jure.

In 1716 he obtained the Galileo-chair at the University of Padua, where he worked on differential equations and geometry. In 1722 he returned to Switzerland and obtained a chair in Logics at the University of Basel.

Nicolaus I Bernoulli was deeply influenced by his family, particularly his uncle Jacob Bernoulli and his cousin Daniel Bernoulli, both of whom were prominent mathematicians. Jacob Bernoulli, one of the early developers of calculus and a pioneer in the field of probability, had a significant impact on Nicolaus’s academic direction. Jacob’s work on the Bernoulli numbers and the Bernoulli theorem provided a strong foundation for Nicolaus’s own research in probability theory.

He was elected a Fellow of the Royal Society of London in 1714.

Nicolaus I Bernoulli had a rich array of personal interests that extended beyond his mathematical pursuits. Influenced by his father, who was a painter, Nicolaus developed a keen appreciation for the arts. This artistic inclination was reflected in his meticulous and creative approach to problem-solving in mathematics. He enjoyed engaging in intellectual discussions and debates, often with his family members, which helped him refine his analytical skills. Additionally, Nicolaus had a passion for teaching and mentoring, finding great satisfaction in guiding his students and witnessing their academic growth. His diverse interests and talents made him a well-rounded individual, contributing to his legacy as a distinguished mathematician and educator.

His most important contributions can be found in his letters, in particular to Pierre Rémond de Montmort. In these letters, he introduced in particular the St. Petersburg Paradox. He also communicated with Gottfried Wilhelm Leibniz and Leonhard Euler.

Nicolaus I Bernoulli died on November 29, 1759, in Basel, Switzerland. The exact cause of his death is not well-documented, but it is generally believed that he suffered from a prolonged illness, possibly tuberculosis.

== Bibliography ==
- Csörgő, Sándor (2001). "Nicolaus Bernoulli". In Heyde, C. C.; Seneta, E. (eds.). Statisticians of the Centuries. New York: Springer. pp. 55–63. doi:10.1007/978-1-4613-0179-0. ISBN 978-0-387-95283-3.
- Merian, Peter (1860). "Niclaus Bernoulli". Die Mathematiker Bernoulli (in German). Basel: Schweighausersche Universitäts-Buchdruckerei. pp. 35–38.
