= Katherine Heinrich =

Australian mathematician and educator

Katherine A. Heinrich (born 21 February 1954) is a mathematician and mathematics teacher who was the first female president of the Canadian Mathematical Society. Her research interests include graph theory and the theory of combinatorial designs. Originally from Australia, she moved to Canada where she worked as a professor at Simon Fraser University and as an academic administrator at the University of Regina.

== Education and career ==
Heinrich was born in Murwillumbah, New South Wales. As an undergraduate at the University of Newcastle in Australia, she graduated as a University Medalist in 1976. She continued at Newcastle as a graduate student and completed her doctorate there in 1979. Her dissertation, "Some problems on combinatorial arrays", was supervised by Walter D. Wallis.

Heinrich joined the mathematics faculty at Simon Fraser University in 1981, and married another graph theorist there, Brian Alspach. She became a full professor in 1987 and chaired the department from 1991 to 1996. While working at Simon Fraser, she co-ordinated several outreach activities including a conference for pre-teen girls called "Women Do Math" and later "Discover the Possibilities", a shopping-center exhibit called "Math in the Malls", and a series of national conferences on mathematics education.

From 1996 to 1998, she was the president of the Canadian Mathematical Society, its first female president. In 1999, she moved to the University of Regina as academic vice president and, in 2003, she was confirmed for a second five-year term as vice president. At Regina, she helped to establish an institute for French-language education and built stronger connections between Regina and the First Nations University of Canada.

She retired in 2007 and returned to Newcastle, New South Wales, where she is active in textile arts.

== Research ==
MathSciNet lists 73 publications for Heinrich, dated from 1976 to 2012. Several of her research publications concern orthogonal Latin squares,^{[A]} analogous concepts in graph theory^{[D]} and applications of these concepts in parallel computing.^{[E]} She has also published works on finding spanning subgraphs with constraints on the degree of each vertex^{[C]} and on Alspach's conjecture on disjoint cycle covers of complete graphs,^{[D]} among other topics.

== Selected publications ==
A.	Heinrich, Katherine; Zhu, L. (1986), "Existence of orthogonal Latin squares with aligned subsquares", Discrete Mathematics, 59 (1–2): 69–78, doi:10.1016/0012-365X(86)90070-1, MR 0837956

B.	Heinrich, Katherine; Horák, Peter; Rosa, Alexander (1989), "On Alspach's conjecture", Discrete Mathematics, 77 (1–3): 97–121, doi:10.1016/0012-365X(89)90355-5, MR 1022455

C.	Heinrich, Katherine; Hell, Pavol; Kirkpatrick, David G.; Liu, Gui Zhen (1990), "A simple existence criterion for $(g<f)$-factors", Discrete Mathematics, 85 (3): 313–317, doi:10.1016/0012-365X(90)90387-W, MR 1081839

D.	Alspach, Brian; Heinrich, Katherine; Liu, Gui Zhen (1992), "Orthogonal factorizations of graphs", Contemporary design theory, Wiley-Interscience Series in Discrete Mathematics and Optimization, New York: Wiley, pp. 13–40, MR 1178499

E.	Colbourn, Charles J.; Heinrich, Katherine (1992), "Conflict-free access to parallel memories", Journal of Parallel and Distributed Computing, 14 (2): 193–200, doi:10.1016/0743-7315(92)90116-5, MR 1143695

== Recognition ==
The University of Newcastle gave Heinrich a Gold Medal for Professional Excellence in 1995. In 2005, she won the Adrien Pouliot Award of the Canadian Mathematical Society for her work in mathematics education.
