= Cycle cover =

In graph theory and combinatorial optimization, cycle cover may refer to:

- Vertex cycle cover
- Vertex disjoint cycle cover
- Edge cycle cover

Other possible meanings include:

- A cover for a bicycle
- Vehicle insurance for a bicycle
