= Derangement =

Type of permutation of a set of elements

Number of possible permutations and derangements of n elements. n! (n factorial) is the number of n-permutations; !n is the number of derangements – n-permutations where all of the n elements change their initial places.

In combinatorial mathematics, a derangement is a permutation of the elements of a set in which no element appears in its original position. In other words, a derangement is a permutation that has no fixed points.

The number of derangements of a set of size n is known as the n th derangement number or the subfactorial of n or n th de Montmort number (after Pierre Remond de Montmort). Notations for subfactorials in common use include D_{n}, d_{n}, !n, or n¡ . (Note: The name "subfactorial" originates with William Allen Whitworth.)

For n > 0 , the subfactorial D_{n} equals the nearest integer to n!/e, where n! denotes the factorial of n and e ≈ 2.718281828... is Euler's number.

The problem of counting derangements was first considered by Pierre Raymond de Montmort in his Essay d'analyse sur les jeux de hazard in 1708; he solved it in 1713, as did Nicholas Bernoulli at about the same time.

== Example ==
The 9 derangements (from 24 permutations) are highlighted.

Suppose that a professor gave a test to 4 students – A, B, C, and D – and wants to let them grade each other's tests. How many ways could the professor hand the tests back to the students for grading, such that no student receives their own test back? Out of 24 possible permutations (4!) for handing back the tests,

ABCD,	ABDC,	ACBD,	ACDB,	ADBC,	ADCB,
BACD,	BADC,	BCAD,	BCDA,	BDAC,	BDCA,
CABD,	CADB,	CBAD,	CBDA,	CDAB,	CDBA,
DABC,	DACB,	DBAC,	DBCA,	DCAB,	DCBA.

there are only 9 derangements (shown in blue italics above). In every other permutation of this 4-member set, at least one student gets their own test back (shown in bold red).

Another version of the problem arises when we ask for the number of ways n letters, each addressed to a different person, can be placed in n pre-addressed envelopes so that no letter appears in the correctly addressed envelope.

== Counting derangements ==
Counting derangements of a set amounts to the hat-check problem, in which one considers the number of ways in which n hats (call them h_{1} through h_{n}) can be returned to n people (P_{1} through P_{n}) such that no hat makes it back to its owner.

Each person may receive any of the n − 1 hats that is not their own. Call the hat which the person P_{1} receives h_{i} and consider h_{i}'s owner: P_{i} receives either P_{1}'s hat, h_{1}, or some other. Accordingly, the problem splits into two possible cases:

1. P_{i} receives a hat other than h_{1}. This case is equivalent to solving the problem with n − 1 people and n − 1 hats because for each of the n − 1 people besides P_{1} there is exactly one hat from among the remaining n − 1 hats that they may not receive (for any P_{j} besides P_{i}, the unreceivable hat is h_{j}, while for P_{i} it is h_{1}). Another way to see this is to rename h_{1} to h_{i}, where the derangement is more explicit: for any j from 2 to n, P_{j} cannot receive h_{j}.
2. P_{i} receives h_{1}. In this case the problem reduces to n − 2 people and n − 2 hats, because P_{1} received h_{i}'s hat and P_{i} received h_{1}'s hat, effectively putting both out of further consideration.

For each of the n − 1 hats that P_{1} may receive, the number of ways that P_{2}, …, P_{n} may all receive hats is the sum of the counts for the two cases.

This gives us the solution to the hat-check problem: Stated algebraically, the number D_{n} of derangements of an n-element set is
$$D_n = \left(n-1\right) \bigl(D_{n-1} + D_{n-2}\bigr) \quad \text{for}\ n \geq 2,$$
where D_{0} = 1 and D_{1} = 0.

The number of derangements of small lengths is given in the table below.

The number of derangements of an n-element set (sequence A000166 in the OEIS) for small n
n	0	1	2	3	4	5	6	7	8	9	10	11	12	13
D_{n}	1	0	1	2	9	44	265	1,854	14,833	133,496	1,334,961	14,684,570	176,214,841	2,290,792,932

There are various other expressions for D_{n}, equivalent to the formula given above. These include
$$D_n = n! \sum_{i=0}^n \frac{(-1)^i}{i!} \quad \text{for}\ n \geq 0$$
and
$$D_n = \left[ \frac{n!}{e} \right] = \left\lfloor\frac{n!}{e}+\frac{1}{2}\right\rfloor \quad \text{for}\ n \geq 1,$$
where [x] is the nearest integer function and ⌊x⌋ is the floor function.

Other related formulas include
$$\begin{align}
D_n &= \left\lfloor \frac{n!+1}{e} \right\rfloor\quad &\text{for}\ n &\ge 1, \\[10px]
D_n &= \left\lfloor \left(e + e^{-1}\right)n!\right\rfloor - \lfloor en!\rfloor\quad &\text{for}\ n &\geq 2, \\[10px]
D_n &= n! - \sum_{i=1}^n \binom{n}{i} \cdot D_{n - i}\quad &\text{for}\ n &\ge 1.
\end{align}$$

The following recurrence also holds:
$$D_n = \begin{cases}
1 & \text{if } n = 0, \\
n \cdot D_{n-1} + (-1)^n & \text{if }n > 0.
\end{cases}$$

=== Derivation by inclusion–exclusion principle ===
One may derive a non-recursive formula for the number of derangements of an n-set, as well. For 1 ≤ k ≤ n we define S_{k} to be the set of permutations of n objects that fix the k th object. Any intersection of a collection of i of these sets fixes a particular set of i objects and therefore contains (n − i)! permutations. There are $\binom{n}{i}$ such collections, so the inclusion–exclusion principle yields
$$\begin{align}
\left|S_1 \cup \dotsm \cup S_n\right|
&= \sum_i \left|S_i\right|
- \sum_{i < j} \left|S_i \cap S_j\right|
+ \sum_{i < j < k} \left|S_i \cap S_j \cap S_k\right|
+ \cdots
+ (-1)^{n + 1} \left|S_1 \cap \dotsm \cap S_n\right|\\
&= \binom{n}{1}(n - 1)! - \binom{n}{2}(n - 2)! + \binom{n}{3}(n - 3)! - \cdots + (-1)^{n+1}\binom{n}{n} 0!\\
&= \sum_{i=1}^n (-1)^{i+1}\binom{n}{i}(n - i)!\\
&= n!\ \sum_{i=1}^n \frac{(-1)^{i+1}}{i!},
\end{align}$$
and since a derangement is a permutation that leaves none of the n objects fixed, this implies
$$D_n = n! - \left|S_1 \cup \dotsm \cup S_n\right| = n! \sum_{i=0}^n \frac{(-1)^i}{i!} .$$

On the other hand,
$$n!=\sum_{i=0}^{n} \binom{n}{i}D_i$$
since we can choose n − i elements to be in their own place and derange the other i elements in just D_{i} ways, by definition.

== Growth rate ==
From
$$D_n = n! \sum_{i=0}^n \frac{(-1)^i}{i!}$$
and
$$e^x = \sum_{i=0}^\infty {x^i \over i!}$$
by substituting x = −1 one immediately obtains that
$$\lim_{n\to\infty} \frac{D_n}{n!} = \lim_{n\to\infty} \sum_{i=0}^n \frac{(-1)^i}{i!} = e^{-1} \approx 0.367879\ldots.$$
This is the limit of the probability that a randomly selected permutation of a large number of objects is a derangement. The probability converges to this limit extremely quickly as n increases, which is why D_{n} is the nearest integer to n!/e. The above semi-log graph shows that the derangement graph lags the permutation graph by an almost constant value.

More information about this calculation and the above limit may be found in the article on the statistics of random permutations.

=== Asymptotic expansion in terms of Bell numbers ===
An asymptotic expansion for the number of derangements in terms of Bell numbers is as follows:
$$D_n = \frac{n!}{e} + \sum_{k=1}^m \left(-1\right)^{n+k-1}\frac{B_k}{n^k} + O\left(\frac{1}{n^{m+1}}\right),$$
where m is any fixed positive integer, and B_{k} denotes the k th Bell number. Moreover, the constant implied by the big O-term does not exceed B_{m + 1}.

== Generalizations ==
The problème des rencontres asks how many permutations of a size-n set have exactly k fixed points.

Derangements are an example of the wider field of constrained permutations. For example, the ménage problem asks if n opposite-sex couples are seated man–woman–man–woman–… around a table, how many ways can they be seated so that nobody is seated next to his or her partner?

More formally, given sets A and S, and some sets U and V of surjections A → S, we often wish to know the number of pairs of functions (f, g) such that f is in U and g is in V, and for all a ∈ A, f(a) ≠ g(a); in other words, where for each f and g, there exists a derangement φ of S such that f(a) = φ(g(a)).

Another generalization is the following problem:

How many anagrams with no fixed letters of a given word are there?

For instance, for a word made of only two different letters, say n letters A and m letters B, the answer is, of course, 1 or 0 according to whether n = m or not, for the only way to form an anagram without fixed letters is to exchange all the A with B, which is possible if and only if n = m. In the general case, for a word with n_{1} letters X_{1}, n_{2} letters X_{2}, …, n_{r} letters X_{r}, it turns out (after a proper use of the inclusion-exclusion formula) that the answer has the form
$$\int_0^\infty P_{n_1}(x) P_{n_2}(x) \cdots P_{n_r}(x) e^{-x} \,dx,$$
for a certain sequence of polynomials P_{n}, where P_{n} has degree n. But the above answer for the case r = 2 gives an orthogonality relation, whence the P_{n} are the Laguerre polynomials (up to a sign that is easily decided).

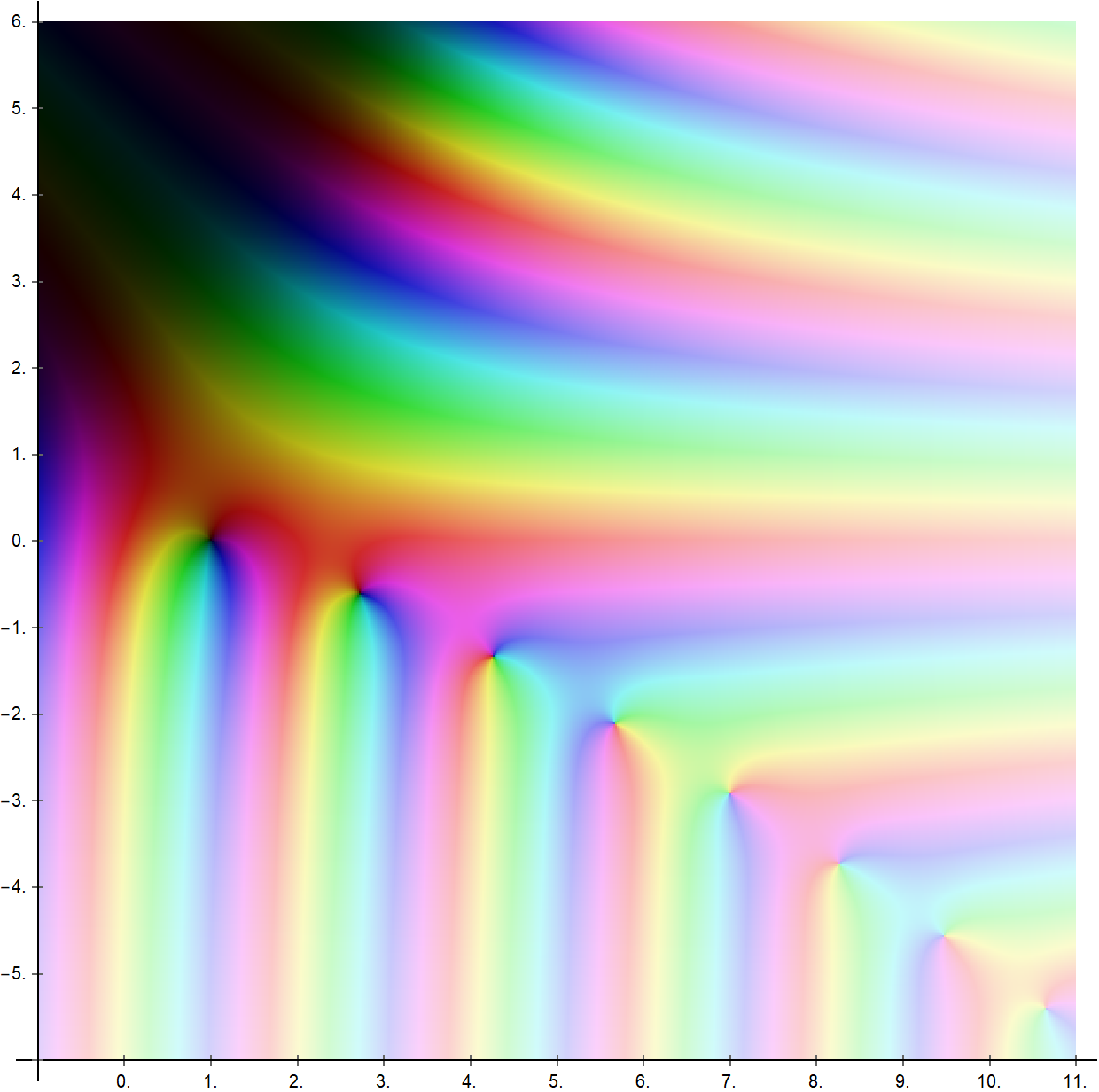
∫^{∞}_{0} (t − 1)^{z} e^{−t} dt in the complex plane

In particular, for the classical derangements, one has that
$$D_n = \frac{ \Gamma(n+1,-1) }{ e } = \int_0^\infty(x - 1)^n e^{-x} \, dx$$
where Γ(s, x) is the upper incomplete gamma function.

== Computational complexity ==
It is NP-complete to determine whether a given permutation group (described by a given set of permutations that generate it) contains any derangements.
