= Rencontres numbers =

In combinatorics, the rencontres numbers are a triangular array of integers that enumerate permutations of the set { 1, ..., n } with specified numbers of fixed points: in other words, partial derangements. (Rencontre is French for encounter. By some accounts, the problem is named after a solitaire game.) For n ≥ 0 and 0 ≤ k ≤ n, the rencontres number D_{n, k} is the number of permutations of { 1, ..., n } that have exactly k fixed points.

For example, if seven presents are given to seven different people, but only two are destined to get the right present, there are D_{7, 2} = 924 ways this could happen. Another often cited example is that of a dance school with 7 opposite-sex couples, where, after tea-break the participants are told to randomly find an opposite-sex partner to continue, then once more there are D_{7, 2} = 924 possibilities that exactly 2 previous couples meet again by chance.

== Numerical values ==
Here is the beginning of this array (sequence A008290 in the OEIS):

k n	0	1	2	3	4	5	6	7	8
0	1								
1	0	1							
2	1	0	1						
3	2	3	0	1					
4	9	8	6	0	1				
5	44	45	20	10	0	1			
6	265	264	135	40	15	0	1		
7	1854	1855	924	315	70	21	0	1	
8	14833	14832	7420	2464	630	112	28	0	1

ordered by number of moved elements

The usual way (table above) to show the rencontres numbers is in columns corresponding to the number of fixed points $k$.
But one can also order them in columns corresponding to the number of moved elements $i = n-k$ (sequence A098825 in the OEIS).
Each entry in the table below on the left can be factored into two terms given in the table below on the right: the product of a binomial coefficient (given first in red) and a subfactorial (given second in blue).
In this order each column corresponds to one subfactorial: $~~~T(n, i) = \binom{n}{i} ~\cdot~ !i$

i n	0	1	2	3	4	5	6	7	8
0	1								
1	1	0							
2	1	0	1						
3	1	0	3	2					
4	1	0	6	8	9				
5	1	0	10	20	45	44			
6	1	0	15	40	135	264	265		
7	1	0	21	70	315	924	1855	1854	
8	1	0	28	112	630	2464	7420	14832	14833

i n	0	1	2	3	4	5	6	7	8
0	1⋅1								
1	1⋅1	1⋅0							
2	1⋅1	2⋅0	1⋅1						
3	1⋅1	3⋅0	3⋅1	1⋅2					
4	1⋅1	4⋅0	6⋅1	4⋅2	1⋅9				
5	1⋅1	5⋅0	10⋅1	10⋅2	5⋅9	1⋅44			
6	1⋅1	6⋅0	15⋅1	20⋅2	15⋅9	6⋅44	1⋅265		
7	1⋅1	7⋅0	21⋅1	35⋅2	35⋅9	21⋅44	7⋅265	1⋅1854	
8	1⋅1	8⋅0	28⋅1	56⋅2	70⋅9	56⋅44	28⋅265	8⋅1854	1⋅14833

== Formulas ==
The numbers in the k = 0 column enumerate derangements. Thus

$$D_{0,0} = 1, \!$$
$$D_{1,0} = 0, \!$$
$$D_{n+2,0} = (n + 1)(D_{n+1,0} + D_{n,0}) \!$$

for non-negative n. It turns out that

$$D_{n,0} = \left\lceil\frac{n!}{e}\right\rfloor,$$

where the ratio is rounded up for even n and rounded down for odd n. For n ≥ 1, this gives the nearest integer.

More generally, for any $k\geq 0$, we have

$$D_{n,k} = {n \choose k} \cdot D_{n-k,0}.$$

The proof is easy after one knows how to enumerate derangements: choose the k fixed points out of n; then choose the derangement of the other n − k points.

The numbers D_{n,0}/(n!) are generated by the power series e^{−z}/(1 − z); accordingly, an explicit formula for D_{n, m} can be derived as follows:

$$D_{n, m}
= \frac{n!}{m!} [z^{n-m}] \frac{e^{-z}}{1-z}
= \frac{n!}{m!} \sum_{k=0}^{n-m} \frac{(-1)^k}{k!}.$$

This immediately implies that

$$D_{n, m} = {n \choose m} D_{n-m, 0} \; \; \mbox{ and } \; \;
\frac{D_{n, m}}{n!} \approx \frac{e^{-1}}{m!}$$

for n large, m fixed.

== Probability distribution ==
The sum of the entries in each row for the table in "Numerical Values" is the total number of permutations of { 1, ..., n }, and is therefore n!. If one divides all the entries in the nth row by n!, one gets the probability distribution of the number of fixed points of a uniformly distributed random permutation of { 1, ..., n }. The probability that the number of fixed points is k is

$${D_{n,k} \over n!}.$$

For n ≥ 1, the expected number of fixed points is 1 (a fact that follows from linearity of expectation).

More generally, for i ≤ n, the ith moment of this probability distribution is the ith moment of the Poisson distribution with expected value 1. For i > n, the ith moment is smaller than that of that Poisson distribution. Specifically, for i ≤ n, the ith moment is the ith Bell number, i.e. the number of partitions of a set of size i.

=== Limiting probability distribution ===
As the size of the permuted set grows, we get

$$\lim_{n\to\infty} {D_{n,k} \over n!} = {e^{-1} \over k!}.$$

This is just the probability that a Poisson-distributed random variable with expected value 1 is equal to k. In other words, as n grows, the probability distribution of the number of fixed points of a random permutation of a set of size n approaches the Poisson distribution with expected value 1.

== See also ==
- Oberwolfach problem, a different mathematical problem involving the arrangement of diners at tables
- Problème des ménages, a similar problem involving partial derangements
