= Waldegrave problem =

In game theory, the Waldegrave problem is a problem first described in the second edition of Pierre Raymond de Montmort`s Essay d'analyse sur les jeux de hazard, which is the first discussion of a mixed strategy to derive a solution in game theory. Montmort originally called Waldegrave's Problem the Problème de la Poulle or the Problem of the Pool. He provides a minimax mixed strategy solution to a two-person version of the card game le her.

The general description of the problem is as follows: Suppose there are n+1 players with each player putting one unit into the pot or pool. The first two players play each other and the winner plays the third player. The loser of each game puts one unit into the pot. Play continues in like fashion through all the players until one of the players has beaten all the others in succession. The original problem, stated in a letter dated 10 April 1711, from Montmort to Nicholas Bernoulli is for n = 2 and is attributed to M. de Waldegrave. The problem, according to Montmort, is to find the expectation of each player and the probability that the pool will be won within a specified number of games.

== Sources ==
- Bellhouse, David (2007), "The Problem of Waldegrave" (PDF), Electronic Journal for History of Probability and Statistics, 3 (2)
