= Ars Conjectandi =

1713 book on probability and combinatorics by Jacob Bernoulli

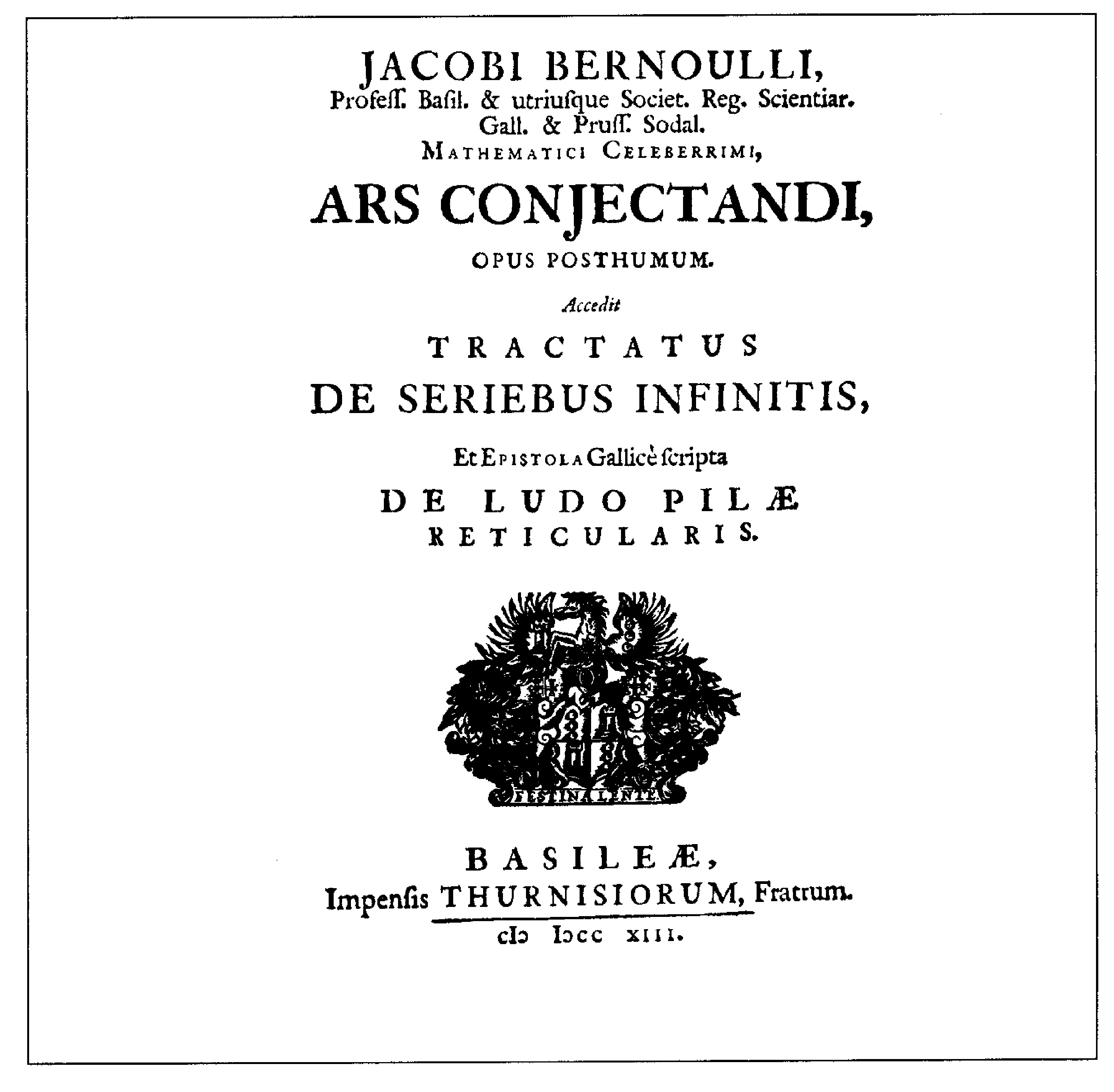
- Cover page
- Author: Jacob Bernoulli
- Language: Latin
- Subject: Probability
- Published: 1713
- Publisher: Impensis Thurnisiorum, Fratrum
- Publication place: Basel, Old Swiss Confederacy

Ars Conjectandi (Latin for "The Art of Conjecturing") is a book on combinatorics and mathematical probability written by Jacob Bernoulli and published in 1713, eight years after his death, by his nephew, Nicolaus I Bernoulli. The seminal work consolidated, apart from many combinatorial topics, many central ideas in probability theory, such as the very first version of the law of large numbers: indeed, it is widely regarded as the founding work of that subject. It also addressed problems that today are classified in the twelvefold way and added to the subjects; consequently, it has been dubbed an important historical landmark in not only probability but all combinatorics by a plethora of mathematical historians. The importance of this early work had a large impact on both contemporary and later mathematicians; for example, Abraham de Moivre.

Bernoulli wrote the text between 1684 and 1689, including the work of mathematicians such as Christiaan Huygens, Gerolamo Cardano, Pierre de Fermat, and Blaise Pascal. He incorporated fundamental combinatorial topics such as his theory of permutations and combinations (the aforementioned problems from the twelvefold way) as well as those more distantly connected to the burgeoning subject: the derivation and properties of the eponymous Bernoulli numbers, for instance. Core topics from probability, such as expected value, were also a significant portion of this important work.

== Background ==
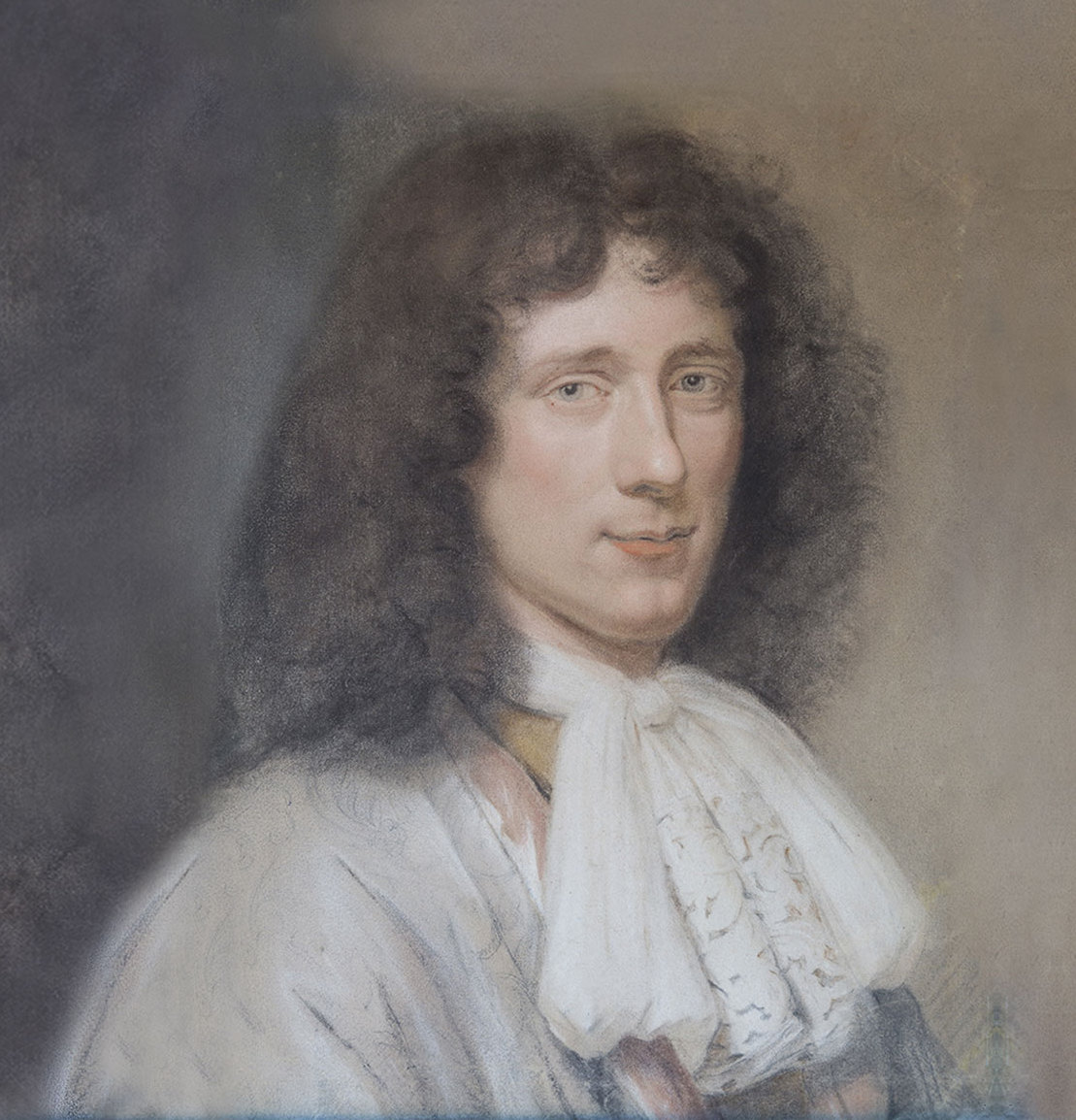
Christiaan Huygens published the first treatise on probability

In Europe, the subject of probability was first formally developed in the 16th century with the work of Gerolamo Cardano, whose interest in the branch of mathematics was largely due to his habit of gambling. He formalized what is now called the classical definition of probability: if an event has a possible outcomes and we select any b of those such that b ≤ a, the probability of any of the b occurring is $\begin{smallmatrix}\frac{b}{a}\end{smallmatrix}$. However, his actual influence on mathematical scene was not great; he wrote only one light tome on the subject titled Liber de ludo aleae (Book on Games of Chance), which was published posthumously in 1663.

The date which historians cite as the beginning of the development of modern probability theory is 1654, when two of the most well-known mathematicians of the time, Blaise Pascal and Pierre de Fermat, began a correspondence discussing the subject. The two initiated the communication because earlier that year, a gambler from Paris named Antoine Gombaud had sent Pascal and other mathematicians several questions on the practical applications of some of these theories; in particular he posed the problem of points, concerning a theoretical two-player game in which a prize must be divided between the players due to external circumstances halting the game. The fruits of Pascal and Fermat's correspondence interested other mathematicians, including Christiaan Huygens, whose De ratiociniis in aleae ludo (Calculations in Games of Chance) appeared in 1657 as the final chapter of Van Schooten's Exercitationes Matematicae. In 1665 Pascal posthumously published his results on the eponymous Pascal's triangle, an important combinatorial concept. He referred to the triangle in his work Traité du triangle arithmétique (Traits of the Arithmetic Triangle) as the "arithmetic triangle".

In 1662, the book La Logique ou l'Art de Penser was published anonymously in Paris. The authors presumably were Antoine Arnauld and Pierre Nicole, two leading Jansenists, who worked together with Blaise Pascal. The Latin title of this book is Ars cogitandi, which was a successful book on logic of the time. The Ars cogitandi consists of four books, with the fourth one dealing with decision-making under uncertainty by considering the analogy to gambling and introducing explicitly the concept of a quantified probability.

In the field of statistics and applied probability, John Graunt published Natural and Political Observations Made upon the Bills of Mortality also in 1662, initiating the discipline of demography. This work, among other things, gave a statistical estimate of the population of London, produced the first life table, gave probabilities of survival of different age groups, examined the different causes of death, noting that the annual rate of suicide and accident is constant, and commented on the level and stability of sex ratio. The usefulness and interpretation of Graunt's tables were discussed in a series of correspondences by brothers Ludwig and Christiaan Huygens in 1667, where they realized the difference between mean and median estimates and Christian even interpolated Graunt's life table by a smooth curve, creating the first continuous probability distribution; but their correspondences were not published. Later, Johan de Witt, the then prime minister of the Dutch Republic, published similar material in his 1671 work Waerdye van Lyf-Renten (A Treatise on Life Annuities), which used statistical concepts to determine life expectancy for practical political purposes; a demonstration of the fact that this sampling branch of mathematics had significant pragmatic applications. De Witt's work was not widely distributed beyond the Dutch Republic, perhaps due to his fall from power and execution by mob in 1672. Apart from the practical contributions of these two work, they also exposed a fundamental idea that probability can be assigned to events that do not have inherent physical symmetry, such as the chances of dying at certain age, unlike say the rolling of a dice or flipping of a coin, simply by counting the frequency of occurrence. Thus, probability could be more than mere combinatorics.

== Development of Ars Conjectandi ==
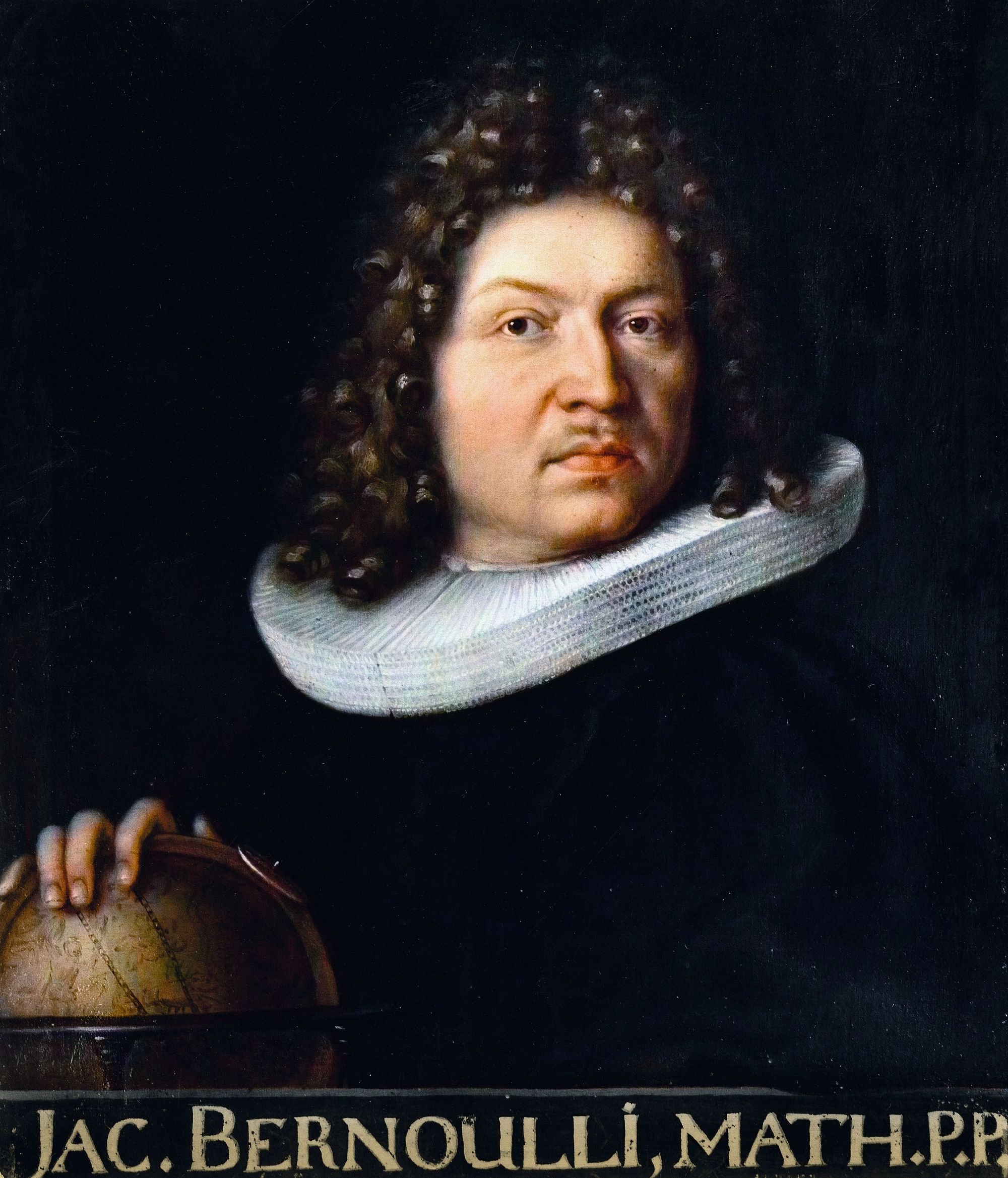
Portrait of Jakob Bernoulli in 1687

In the wake of all these pioneers, Bernoulli produced many of the results contained in Ars Conjectandi between 1684 and 1689, which he recorded in his diary Meditationes. When he began the work in 1684 at the age of 30, while intrigued by combinatorial and probabilistic problems, Bernoulli had not yet read Pascal's work on the "arithmetic triangle" nor de Witt's work on the applications of probability theory: he had earlier requested a copy of the latter from his acquaintance Gottfried Leibniz, but Leibniz failed to provide it. The latter, however, did manage to provide Pascal's and Huygens' work, and thus it is largely upon these foundations that Ars Conjectandi is constructed. Apart from these works, Bernoulli certainly possessed or at least knew the contents from secondary sources of the La Logique ou l'Art de Penser as well as Graunt's Bills of Mortality, as he makes explicit reference to these two works.

Bernoulli's progress over time can be pursued by means of the Meditationes. Three working periods with respect to his "discovery" can be distinguished by aims and times. The first period, which lasts from 1684 to 1685, is devoted to the study of the problems regarding the games of chance posed by Christiaan Huygens; during the second period (1685-1686) the investigations are extended to cover processes where the probabilities are not known a priori, but have to be determined a posteriori. Finally, in the last period (1687-1689), the problem of measuring the probabilities is solved.

Before the publication of his Ars Conjectandi, Bernoulli had produced a number of treatises related to probability:

- Parallelismus ratiocinii logici et algebraici, Basel, 1685.
- In the Journal des Sçavans 1685 (26.VIII), p. 314 there appear two problems concerning the probability each of two players may have of winning in a game of dice. Solutions were published in the Acta Eruditorum 1690 (May), pp. 219–223 in the article Quaestiones nonnullae de usuris, cum solutione Problematis de Sorte Alearum. In addition, Leibniz himself published a solution in the same journal on pages 387-390.
- Theses logicae de conversione et oppositione enunciationum, a public lecture delivered at Basel, 12 February 1686. Theses XXXI to XL are related to the theory of probability.
- De Arte Combinatoria Oratio Inauguralis, 1692.
- The Letter à un amy sur les parties du jeu de paume, that is, a letter to a friend on sets in the game of Tennis, published with the Ars Conjectandi in 1713.

Between 1703 and 1705, Leibniz corresponded with Jakob after learning about his discoveries in probability from his brother Johann. Leibniz managed to provide thoughtful criticisms on Bernoulli's law of large numbers, but failed to provide Bernoulli with de Witt's work on annuities that he so desired. From the outset, Bernoulli wished for his work to demonstrate that combinatorics and probability theory would have numerous real-world applications in all facets of society—in the line of Graunt's and de Witt's work— and would serve as a rigorous method of logical reasoning under insufficient evidence, as used in courtrooms and in moral judgements. It was also hoped that the theory of probability could provide comprehensive and consistent method of reasoning, where ordinary reasoning might be overwhelmed by the complexity of the situation. Thus the title Ars Conjectandi was chosen: a link to the concept of ars inveniendi from scholasticism, which provided the symbolic link to pragmatism he desired and also as an extension of the prior Ars Cogitandi.

In Bernoulli's own words, the "art of conjecture" is defined in Chapter II of Part IV of his Ars Conjectandi as:

The art of measuring, as precisely as possible, probabilities of things, with the goal that we would be able always to choose or follow in our judgments and actions that course, which will have been determined to be better, more satisfactory, safer or more advantageous.

The development of the book was terminated by Bernoulli's death in 1705; thus the book is essentially incomplete when compared with Bernoulli's original vision. The quarrel with his younger brother Johann, who was the most competent person who could have fulfilled Jacob's project, prevented Johann from accessing the manuscript. Jacob's own children were not mathematicians and were not up to the task of editing and publishing the manuscript. Finally Jacob's nephew Nicolaus, 7 years after Jacob's death in 1705, managed to publish the manuscript in 1713.

== Contents ==
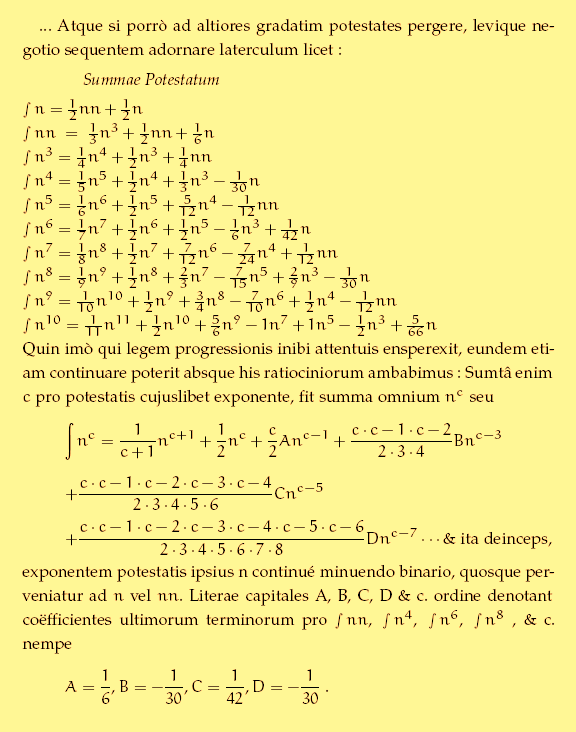
Cutout of a page from Ars Conjectandi showing Bernoulli's formula for sum of integer powers. The last line gives his eponymous numbers.

Bernoulli's work, originally published in Latin is divided into four parts. It covers most notably his theory of permutations and combinations; the standard foundations of combinatorics today and subsets of the foundational problems today known as the twelvefold way. It also discusses the motivation and applications of a sequence of numbers more closely related to number theory than probability; these Bernoulli numbers bear his name today, and are one of his more notable achievements.

The first part is an in-depth expository on Huygens' De ratiociniis in aleae ludo. Bernoulli provides in this section solutions to the five problems Huygens posed at the end of his work. He particularly develops Huygens' concept of expected value—the weighted average of all possible outcomes of an event. Huygens had developed the following formula:

$E=\frac{p_0a_0+p_1a_1+p_2a_2+\cdots+p_na_n}{p_0+p_1+\cdots+p_n}.$

In this formula, E is the expected value, p_{i} are the probabilities of attaining each value, and a_{i} are the attainable values. Bernoulli normalizes the expected value by assuming that p_{i} are the probabilities of all the disjoint outcomes of the value, hence implying that p_{0} + p_{1} + ... + p_{n} = 1. Another key theory developed in this part is the probability of achieving at least a certain number of successes from a number of binary events, today named Bernoulli trials, given that the probability of success in each event was the same. Bernoulli shows through mathematical induction that given a the number of favorable outcomes in each event, b the number of total outcomes in each event, d the desired number of successful outcomes, and e the number of events, the probability of at least d successes is

$P=\sum_{i=0}^{e-d}\binom{e}{d+i}\left(\frac{a}{b}\right)^{d+i}\left(\frac{b-a}{b}\right)^{e-d-i}.$

The first part concludes with what is now known as the Bernoulli distribution.

The second part expands on enumerative combinatorics, or the systematic numeration of objects. It was in this part that two of the most important of the twelvefold ways—the permutations and combinations that would form the basis of the subject—were fleshed out, though they had been introduced earlier for the purposes of probability theory. He gives the first non-inductive proof of the binomial expansion for integer exponent using combinatorial arguments. On a note more distantly related to combinatorics, the second section also discusses the general formula for sums of integer powers; the free coefficients of this formula are therefore called the Bernoulli numbers, which influenced Abraham de Moivre's work later, and which have proven to have numerous applications in number theory.

In the third part, Bernoulli applies the probability techniques from the first section to the common chance games played with playing cards or dice. He does not feel the necessity to describe the rules and objectives of the card games he analyzes. He presents probability problems related to these games and, once a method had been established, posed generalizations. For example, a problem involving the expected number of "court cards"—jack, queen, and king—one would pick in a five-card hand from a standard deck of 52 cards containing 12 court cards could be generalized to a deck with a cards that contained b court cards, and a c-card hand.

The fourth section continues the trend of practical applications by discussing applications of probability to civilibus, moralibus, and oeconomicis, or to personal, judicial, and financial decisions. In this section, Bernoulli differs from the school of thought known as frequentism, which defined probability in an empirical sense. As a counter, he produces a result resembling the law of large numbers, which he describes as predicting that the results of observation would approach theoretical probability as more trials were held—in contrast, frequents defined probability in terms of the former. Bernoulli was very proud of this result, referring to it as his "golden theorem", and remarked that it was "a problem in which I've engaged myself for twenty years". This early version of the law is known today as either Bernoulli's theorem or the weak law of large numbers, as it is less rigorous and general than the modern version.

After these four primary expository sections, almost as an afterthought, Bernoulli appended to Ars Conjectandi a tract on calculus, which concerned infinite series. It was a reprint of five dissertations he had published between 1686 and 1704.

== Legacy ==
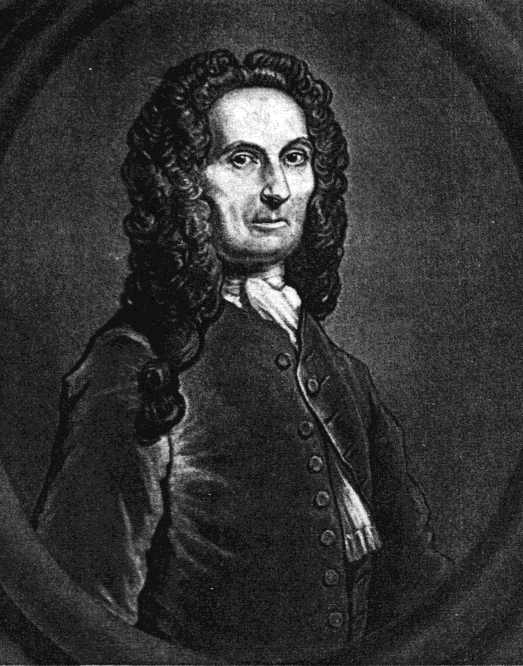
Abraham de Moivre's work was built in part on Bernoulli's

Ars Conjectandi is considered a landmark work in combinatorics and the founding work of mathematical probability. Among others, an anthology of great mathematical writings published by Elsevier and edited by historian Ivor Grattan-Guinness describes the studies set out in the work "[occupying] mathematicians throughout 18th and 19th centuries"—an influence lasting three centuries. Statistician Anthony Edwards praised not only the book's groundbreaking content, writing that it demonstrated Bernoulli's "thorough familiarity with the many facets [of combinatorics]," but its form: "[Ars Conjectandi] is a very well-written book, excellently constructed." Perhaps most recently, notable popular mathematical historian and topologist William Dunham called the paper "the next milestone of probability theory [after the work of Cardano]" as well as "Jakob Bernoulli's masterpiece". It greatly aided what Dunham describes as "Bernoulli's long-established reputation".

Bernoulli's work influenced many contemporary and subsequent mathematicians. Even the afterthought-like tract on calculus has been quoted frequently; most notably by the Scottish mathematician Colin Maclaurin. Jacob's program of applying his art of conjecture to the matters of practical life, which was terminated by his death in 1705, was continued by his nephew Nicolaus Bernoulli, after having taken parts verbatim out of Ars Conjectandi, for his own dissertation entitled De Usu Artis Conjectandi in Jure which was published already in 1709. Nicolas finally edited and assisted in the publication of Ars conjectandi in 1713. Later Nicolaus also edited Jacob Bernoulli's complete works and supplemented it with results taken from Jacob's diary.

Pierre Rémond de Montmort, in collaboration with Nicolaus Bernoulli, wrote a book on probability Essay d'analyse sur les jeux de hazard which appeared in 1708, which can be seen as an extension of the Part III of Ars Conjectandi which applies combinatorics and probability to analyze games of chance commonly played at that time. Abraham de Moivre also wrote extensively on the subject in De mensura sortis: Seu de Probabilitate Eventuum in Ludis a Casu Fortuito Pendentibus of 1711 and its extension The Doctrine of Chances or, a Method of Calculating the Probability of Events in Play of 1718. De Moivre's most notable achievement in probability was the discovery of the first instance of central limit theorem, by which he was able to approximate the binomial distribution with the normal distribution. To achieve this De Moivre developed an asymptotic sequence for the factorial function —- which we now refer to as Stirling's approximation —- and Bernoulli's formula for the sum of powers of numbers. Both Montmort and de Moivre adopted the term probability from Jacob Bernoulli, which had not been used in all the previous publications on gambling, and both their works were enormously popular.

The refinement of Bernoulli's Golden Theorem, regarding the convergence of theoretical probability and empirical probability, was taken up by many notable latter day mathematicians like De Moivre, Laplace, Poisson, Chebyshev, Markov, Borel, Cantelli, Kolmogorov and Khinchin. The complete proof of the Law of Large Numbers for the arbitrary random variables was finally provided during first half of 20th century.

A significant indirect influence was Thomas Simpson, who achieved a result that closely resembled de Moivre's. According to Simpsons' work's preface, his own work depended greatly on de Moivre's; the latter in fact described Simpson's work as an abridged version of his own. Finally, Thomas Bayes wrote an essay discussing theological implications of de Moivre's results: his solution to a problem, namely that of determining the probability of an event by its relative frequency, was taken as a proof for the existence of God by Bayes. Finally in 1812, Pierre-Simon Laplace published his Théorie analytique des probabilités in which he consolidated and laid down many fundamental results in probability and statistics such as the moment generating function, method of least squares, inductive probability, and hypothesis testing, thus completing the final phase in the development of classical probability. Indeed, in light of all this, there is good reason Bernoulli's work is hailed as such a seminal event; not only did his various influences, direct and indirect, set the mathematical study of combinatorics spinning, but even theology was impacted.

== See also ==
- Multinomial distribution
- Bernoulli trial
- Law of large numbers
- Bernoulli numbers
- Binomial distribution
