= Cun-Quan Zhang =

Chinese-American mathematician (b.1952)

C.Q. Zhang
- Born: 1952
- Education: Simon Fraser University,
- Known for: Integer Flows and Cycle Covers
- Awards: Benedum Distinguished Scholar Award from West Virginia University
- Scientific career
- Fields: Mathematics,Graph Theory
- Workplaces: West Virginia University
- Thesis: Longest Cycles in Graphs (1986)
- Doctoral advisor: Brian Alspach
- Doctoral students: 15

C.Q. Zhang (full name: Cun-Quan Zhang) was Eberly Distinguished Professor at West Virginia University, is a mathematician working mainly in graph theory. He received his Ph.D. (mathematics) in 1986 from Simon Fraser University, under the supervision of Brian Alspach.

== Education ==
Cun-Quan Zhang does not have undergraduate education due to Cultural Revolution in China. In 1978, the first year of the return of the Nationwide Entrance Examination for Admissions to Chinese Universities and Colleges (Gaokao in Chinese), he took Graduate Program Admission Exam, and was admitted by Qufu Normal University. In 1981, he earned his M.Sc. (Operational Research) with his dissertation under the supervision of Prof. Yongjin Zhu in Chinese Academy of Sciences. After a brief employment in Chinese Academy of Sciences, he was admitted by Simon Fraser University in 1982, earned his Ph.D. (mathematics) in 1986 under the supervision of Prof. Brian Alspach.

== Biography ==
In 1987, Zhang joined the faculty of West Virginia University, where he was promoted to Associate Professor in 1989 and Professor in 1996 and Eberly Distinguished Professor in 2009.

== Research achievements and recognitions ==
His research accomplishments in mathematics were recognized with his appointment as an Eberly Distinguished Professor at West Virginia University.

C.Q. Zhang is a mathematician who has contributed to nowhere-zero flow, cycle double cover, and Hamiltonian cycle in graph theory.

Some major results in Zhang's research include the following:

- Hamilton cycle problems for graphs, especially his method of vertex inserting.
- Cycle double cover conjecture. He (collaborated with Brian Alspach) proved that every cubic graph without the Petersen minor has a cycle double cover.
- Integer 3-flow problems. He (collaborated with L.M. Lovász, C. Thomassen and Y. Wu) proved that every 6-connected graph admits a nowhere-zero-3-flow, which is the best partial result to Tutte’s 3-flow conjecture.

== Books ==
- Zhang, Cun-Quan (1997). Integer Flows and Cycle Covers of Graphs. CRC Press. ISBN 978-0-8247-9790-4.
- Zhang, Cun-Quan (2012). Circuit Double Cover of Graphs. Cambridge University Press. ISBN 978-0-5212-8235-2.
