= Phyllis Chinn =

American mathematician

- Born: September 26, 1941 (age 85); Rochester, New York
- Awards: Louise Hay Award

Academic background
- Education: Brandeis University . University of California, Santa Barbara
- Doctoral advisor: Paul Kelly

Academic work
- Discipline: Mathematics
- Sub-discipline: graph bandwidth
- Institutions: Towson State College, Cal Poly Humboldt

Phyllis Zweig Chinn (née Zweig; born September 26, 1941) is an American mathematician who holds a professorship in mathematics, women's studies, and teaching preparation at Cal Poly Humboldt in California. Her publications concern graph theory, mathematics education, and the history of women in mathematics.

== Education and career ==
Chinn was born in Rochester, New York and graduated in 1962 from Brandeis University. She earned her Ph.D. in 1969 from the University of California, Santa Barbara with a dissertation on graph isomorphism supervised by Paul Kelly. She taught at Towson State College, a training school for teachers in Maryland, from 1969 to 1975, and earned tenure there in 1974, before moving to Cal Poly Humboldt. At the time she joined the Cal Poly Humboldt faculty, she was the first female mathematics professor there; the only other female professor in the sciences was a biologist.

In 1997 she became chair of the mathematics department at Cal Poly Humboldt.

== Contributions ==
Chinn has written highly cited work on graph bandwidth, dominating sets, and on bandwidth.

Chinn is also an avid juggler, and founded a juggling club at Cal Poly Humboldt in the 1980s.

== Recognition ==
Cal Poly Humboldt named Chinn as Outstanding Professor for 1988–1989. She was the 2010 winner of the Louise Hay Award for Contributions to Mathematics Education, given by the Association for Women in Mathematics, for her work in improving mathematics education at the middle and high school levels and encouraging young women to become mathematicians.
