= Le her =

French card game

Le her (or le hère) is a French card game that dates back to the 16th century. It is quoted by the French poet Marc Papillon de Lasphrise in 1597. Under the name coucou it is mentioned in Rabelais' long list of games (in Gargantua, 1534). Le Her belongs to the family of Ranter-Go-Round games. It is played with a standard deck of 52 cards by two people, designated the dealer and the receiver. King is ranked high and ace low.

To play, the dealer gives one card to the receiver and one to the dealer. The receiver may choose to exchange cards with the dealer, unless the dealer has a king, in which case no exchange occurs. Then, the dealer may choose to exchange with the top card of the deck, unless the top card is a king, in which case no exchange occurs. In the case of the dealer and receiver having same ranked cards, the dealer is the winner.

Le her played a role in the development of the mathematical theory of probability with solutions, being sought by Bernoulli and de Montmort. The game was analyzed by Charles Waldegrave, leading to the creation of the Waldegrave problem.
