= Brian Alspach =

American mathematician

Brian Roger Alspach is a mathematician whose main research interest is in graph theory. Alspach has also studied the mathematics behind poker, and writes for Poker Digest and Canadian Poker Player magazines.

== Biography ==
Brian Alspach was born on May 29, 1938, in North Dakota. He attended the University of Washington from 1957 to 1961, receiving his B.A. in 1961. He taught at a junior high school for one year before beginning his graduate studies. In 1964 he received his master's degree and in 1966 he obtained his Ph.D. from the University of California, Santa Barbara under the supervision of Paul Kelly. He taught at Simon Fraser University for 33 years. He retired from there in 1998. He currently works as an adjunct professor at the University of Regina and has been there since 1999. He is responsible for creating an industrial mathematics degree at Simon Fraser University.

Brian Alspach believes that the growth and future of mathematics will depend on the business people in the industrial businesses. His interests are in graph theory and its applications. One of his theories of coverings and decomposition has been applied to scheduling issues that can arise in the business world. Alspach states that his biggest issue with this is trying to explain such complex math to people in the business world with only a basic understanding of math. He has mentored a total of 13 Ph.D. students. His wife is the former vice president of academics at the University of Regina where he was an adjunct professor. Brian is currently employed as conjoint professor at the University of Newcastle.

== Research ==
One of his first publications was an article titled Cycles of each length in regular tournaments, which was published in the Canadian Mathematical Bulletin (November, 1967).

Another influential piece of Brian Alspach is Point-symmetric graphs and digraphs of prime order and transitive permutation groups of prime degree, which was published in the Journal of Combinatorial Theory (August, 1973).

In his article titled Isomorphism of circulant graphs and digraphs which was published in Discrete Mathematics (February, 1979). He discusses the isomorphism problem for a special class of graphs.

Brian Alspach coauthored an article with T. D. Parsons titled A construction for vertex –transitive graph published in the Canadian Journal of Mathematics (April, 1982).

Cycle double cover conjecture is one of the major open problems in graph theory. This conjecture was solved by Brian Alspach and Cun-Quan Zhang for the family of Petersen-minor free graph

Alspach's conjecture, posed by Alspach in 1981, concerns the characterization of disjoint cycle covers of complete graphs with prescribed cycle lengths. With Heather Gavlas Jordon, in 2001, Alspach proved a special case, on the decomposition of complete graphs into cycles that all have the same length. This is possible if and only if the complete graph has an odd number of vertices (so its degree is even), the given cycle length is at most the number of vertices (so that cycles of that length exist), and the given length divides the number of edges of the graph. A proof of the full conjecture was published in 2014.
