= Paul Kelly (mathematician) =

American mathematician

Paul Joseph Kelly (June 26, 1915 – July 15, 1995) was an American mathematician who worked in geometry and graph theory.

== Education and career ==
Kelly was born in Riverside, California. He earned bachelor's and master's degrees from the University of California, Los Angeles before moving to the University of Wisconsin–Madison for doctoral studies; he earned his Ph.D. in 1942 with a dissertation concerning geometric transformations under the supervision of Stanislaw Ulam.

He spent the rest of the war years serving in the United States Air Force as a First Lieutenant, before returning to academia with a teaching appointment at the University of Southern California in 1946. He moved to the University of California, Santa Barbara in 1949, and was chair there from 1957 to 1962. At UCSB, his students included Brian Alspach (through whom he has nearly 30 academic descendants) and Phyllis Chinn. He retired in 1982.

== Contributions ==
Kelly is known for posing the reconstruction conjecture with his advisor Ulam, which states that every graph is uniquely determined by the ensemble of subgraphs formed by deleting one vertex in each possible way. He also proved a special case of this conjecture, for trees.

He is the coauthor of three textbooks: Projective geometry and projective metrics (1953, with Herbert Busemann), Geometry and convexity: A study in mathematical methods (1979, with Max L. Weiss), and The non-Euclidean, hyperbolic plane: Its structure and consistency (1981, with Gordon Matthews).

== Selected articles ==
- with David Merriell: Kelly, Paul; Merriell, David (1960). "A class of graphs". Trans. Amer. Math. Soc. 96 (3): 488–492. doi:10.1090/s0002-9947-1960-0115932-0. MR 0115932.
- with E. G. Straus: Kelly, P. J.; Straus, E. G. (1957). "Inversive and conformal convexity". Proc. Amer. Math. Soc. 8 (3): 572–577. doi:10.1090/s0002-9939-1957-0087973-9. MR 0087973.
- Kelly, Paul J. (1949). "On Minkowski bodies of constant width". Bull. Amer. Math. Soc. 55 (12): 1147–1150. doi:10.1090/s0002-9904-1949-09345-x. MR 0033079.
- Kelly, Paul J. (1948). "On isometries of product sets". Bull. Amer. Math. Soc. 54 (8): 723–727. doi:10.1090/s0002-9904-1948-09063-2. MR 0026320.
- Kelly, Paul J. (1945). "On isometries of square sets". Bull. Amer. Math. Soc. 51 (12): 960–963. doi:10.1090/s0002-9904-1945-08482-1. MR 0013898.
