= Alspach's conjecture =

Solved conjecture in graph theory

Alspach's conjecture is a mathematical theorem that characterizes the disjoint cycle covers of complete graphs with prescribed cycle lengths. It is named after Brian Alspach, who posed it as a research problem in 1981. A proof was published by Darryn Bryant, Daniel Horsley, and William Pettersson (2014).

== Formulation ==
In this context, a disjoint cycle cover is a set of simple cycles, no two of which use the same edge, that include all of the edges of a graph. For a disjoint cycle cover to exist, it is necessary for every vertex to have even degree, because the degree of each vertex is two times the number of cycles that include that vertex, an even number. And for the cycles in a disjoint cycle cover to have a given collection of lengths, it is also necessary for the sum of the given cycle lengths to equal the total number of edges in the given graph. Alspach conjectured that, for complete graphs, these two necessary conditions are also sufficient: if $n$ is odd (so that the degrees are even) and a given list of cycle lengths (all at most $n$) adds to $\tbinom{n}{2}$ (the number of edges in the complete graph) then the complete graph $K_n$ can always be decomposed into cycles of the given length. It is this statement that Bryant, Horsley, and Pettersson proved.

== Generalization to even numbers of vertices ==
For complete graphs $K_n$ whose number $n$ of vertices is even, Alspach conjectured that it is always possible to decompose the graph into a perfect matching and a collection of cycles of prescribed lengths summing to $\tbinom{n}{2} - \tfrac{n}{2}$. In this case the matching eliminates the odd degree at each vertex, leaving a subgraph of even degree, and the remaining condition is again that the sum of the cycle lengths equals the number of edges to be covered. This variant of the conjecture was also proven by Bryant, Horsley, and Pettersson.

== Related problems ==
The Oberwolfach problem on decompositions of complete graphs into copies of a given 2-regular graph is related, but neither is a special case of the other. If $G$ is a 2-regular graph with $n$ vertices, formed from a disjoint union of cycles of certain lengths, then a solution to the Oberwolfach problem for $G$ would also provide a decomposition of the complete graph into $(n-1)/2$ copies of each of the cycles of $G$. However, not every decomposition of $K_n$ into this many cycles of each size can be grouped into disjoint cycles that form copies of $G$, and on the other hand not every instance of Alspach's conjecture involves sets of cycles that have $(n-1)/2$ copies of each cycle.
