= Vertex cycle cover =

A non-disjoint cycle cover, an edge-disjoint cycle cover, and a vertex-disjoint and edge-disjoint cycle cover, respectively

In mathematics, a vertex cycle cover (commonly called simply cycle cover) of a graph G is a set of cycles which are subgraphs of G and contain all vertices of G.

If the cycles of the cover have no vertices in common, the cover is called vertex-disjoint or sometimes simply disjoint cycle cover. This is sometimes known as exact vertex cycle cover. In this case the set of the cycles constitutes a spanning subgraph of G. A disjoint cycle cover of an undirected graph (if it exists) can be found in polynomial time by transforming the problem into a problem of finding a perfect matching in a larger graph.

If the cycles of the cover have no edges in common, the cover is called edge-disjoint or simply disjoint cycle cover.

Similar definitions exist for digraphs, in terms of directed cycles. Finding a vertex-disjoint cycle cover of a directed graph can also be performed in polynomial time by a similar reduction to perfect matching. However, adding the condition that each cycle should have length at least 3 makes the problem NP-hard.

== Properties and applications ==
=== Permanent ===
The permanent of a (0,1)-matrix is equal to the number of vertex-disjoint cycle covers of a directed graph with this adjacency matrix. This fact is used in a simplified proof showing that computing the permanent is #P-complete.

=== Minimal disjoint cycle covers ===
The problems of finding a vertex disjoint and edge disjoint cycle covers with minimal number of cycles are NP-complete. The problems are not in complexity class APX. The variants for digraphs are not in APX either.

== See also ==
- Edge cycle cover, a collection of cycles covering all edges of G
