= Essay d'analyse sur les jeux de hazard =

1708 book by Pierre Remond de Montmort

Essay d'analyse sur les jeux de hazard (Essay on the Analysis of Games of Chance) is a book on combinatorics and mathematical probability written by Pierre Remond de Montmort published in 1708 with an expanded second edition in 1713. It was the first comprehensive text published on probability theory.

With Essay, Montmort intended to incorporate and build upon Jacob Bernoulli's unfinished Ars Conjectandi, which remained unpublished at the time of Jacob's death. Both works applied theories of combinatorics and probability to analyze games of chance popular at the time. Essay additionally solved problems posed by Christiaan Huygens' treatise De ratiociniis in ludo aleae (On Reasoning in Games of Chance, 1657) and proposed the solutions for new and more complex problems. Essay greatly influenced the thinking of Montmort's more famous contemporaries, Nicolaus I Bernoulli and Abraham De Moivre.

== Continuation of Montmort's work ==
In 1710, Montmort began a three-year correspondence with Nicolaus I Bernoulli, Jacob Bernoulli's nephew, which was incorporated into the second edition of Essay published in 1713. The correspondence covers many topics, particularly the probability questions that arose from the original edition of the book. Also that year, Nicolaus published Jacob's Ars Conjectandi, eight years after Jacob's death.

The second edition of Essay is twice as long as the first edition and is divided into five sections:

1. A Treatise on Combinations;
2. Problems on Games of Chance;
3. Problem on Quinquenove;
4. Various Problems; and
5. Correspondence

The second section studies the card games: Pharaon, Lansquenet, Treize, Bassette, Piquet, Triomphe, L'Ombre, Brelan, Imperial and Quinze. The third section examines games played with dice: Quinquenove, Hazard, Esperance, TricTrac, Trois Dez, Rafle, Trois Rafles, and Noyaux. The fourth section solves problems posed in Huygen's De ratiociniis in ludo aleae and poses four unsolved problems. The fifth section contains Montmort's correspondence with Nicolaus Bernoulli and introduces the St. Petersburg paradox and the Waldegrave problem.

== Sources ==
- David, F.N. (1998) [1962], Games, Gods, and Gambling: A History of Probability and Statistical Ideas (reprint ed.), Courier Corporation, p. 275, ISBN 9780486400235
- Montmort, Pierre Rémond (1708), Essay d'analyse sur les jeux de hazard (in French) (1st ed.), Paris: Quillau, p. 189
- Montmort, Pierre Rémond (1713), Essay d'analyse sur les jeux de hazard (in French) (2nd ed.), Paris: Quillau, p. 416
