= Pierre Remond de Montmort =

French mathematician (1678–1719)

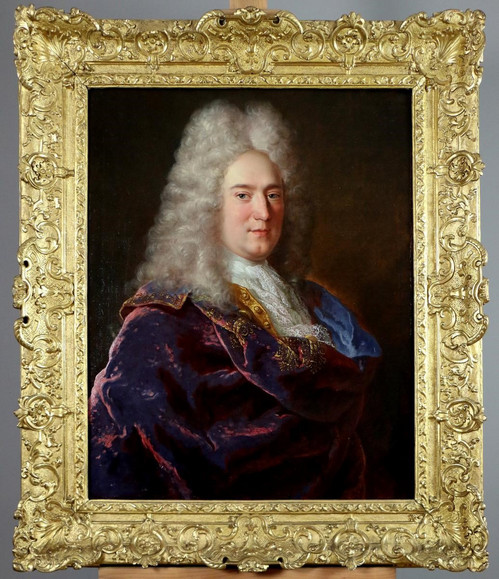
- Born: 27 October 1678; Paris, France
- Died: 7 October 1719 (aged 40); Paris, France
- Known for: Works in probability theory
- Awards: Fellow of the Royal Society
- Scientific career
- Fields: Mathematics

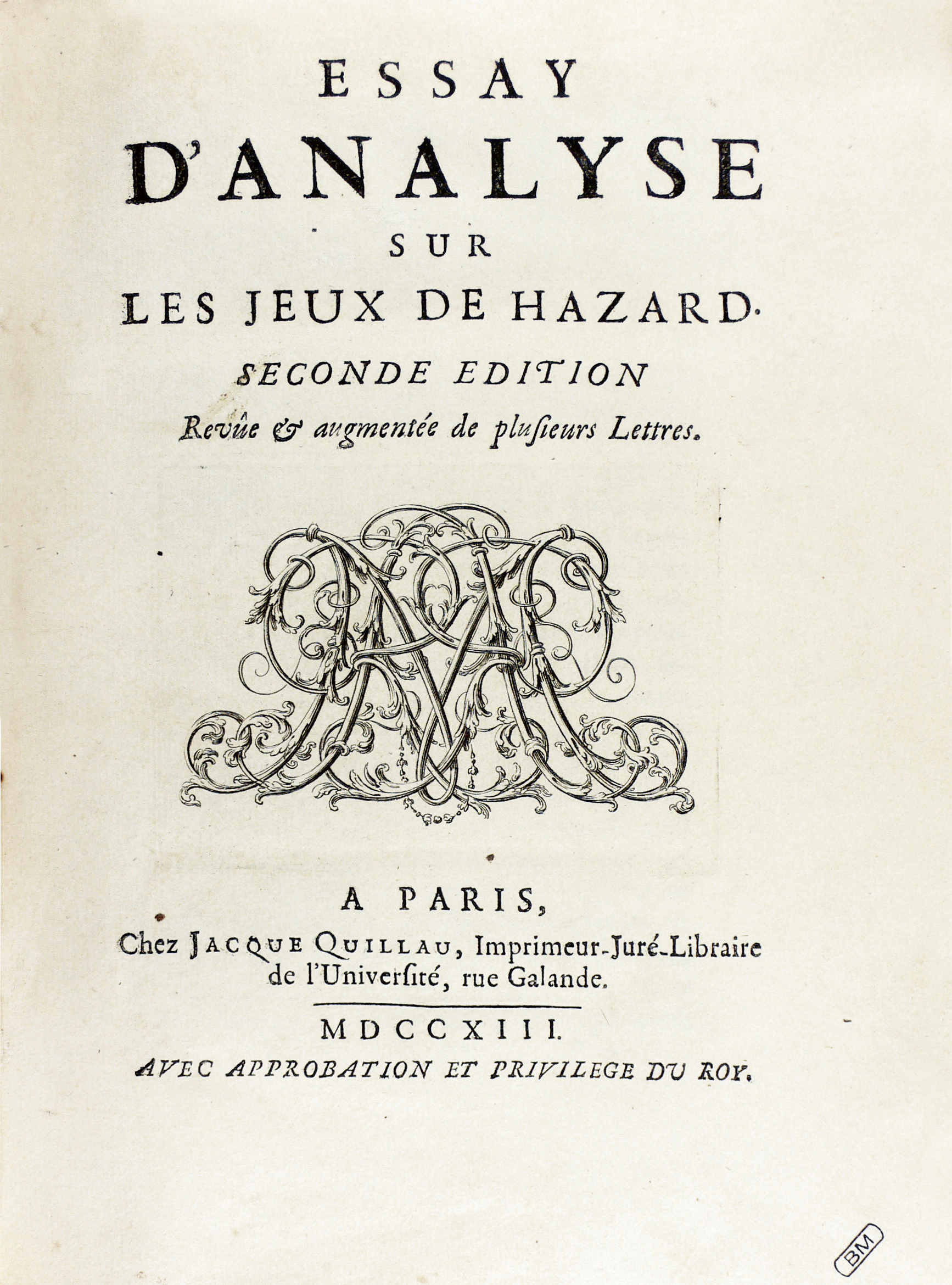
Essay d'analyse sur les jeux de hazard, 1713.

Pierre Remond de Montmort (27 October 1678 – 7 October 1719) was a French mathematician.

== Life ==
His name was originally just Pierre Remond. He was born on 27 October 1678 in Paris. His father pressured him to study law, but he rebelled and travelled to England and Germany, returning to France in 1699 when, upon receiving a large inheritance from his father, he bought an estate and took the name de Montmort. He was friendly with several other notable mathematicians, and especially Nicholas Bernoulli, who collaborated with him while visiting his estate. He was elected a fellow of the Royal Society in 1715, while traveling again to England, and became a member of the French Academy of Sciences in 1716.

De Montmort is known for his book on probability and games of chance, Essay d'analyse sur les jeux de hazard, which was also the first to introduce the combinatorial study of derangements. He is also known for naming Pascal's triangle after Blaise Pascal, calling it "Table de M. Pascal pour les combinaisons."

Another of de Montmort's interests was the subject of finite differences. He determined in 1713 the sum of n terms of a finite series of the form

$$na + \frac{n(n-1)}{1\cdot 2} \, \Delta a + \frac{n(n-1)(n-2)}{1\cdot 2\cdot 3} \, \Delta^2 a +\cdots,$$

where Δ is the forward difference operator, a theorem which seems to have been independently rediscovered by Goldbach in 1718.

He died on 7 October 1719 in Paris.

== Sources ==
- Rouse Ball, W. W. (1908). A short account of the history of Mathematics, 4th edition. MacMillan and Co., Ltd.
