= Edge cycle cover =

An edge cycle cover for each graph. The covering of the middle graph is edge-disjoint, while the one of the right graph is vertex-disjoint.

In graph theory, a branch of mathematics, an edge cycle cover (sometimes called simply cycle cover) of a graph is a family of cycles which are subgraphs of G and contain all edges of G.

If the cycles of the cover have no vertices in common, the cover is called vertex-disjoint or sometimes simply disjoint cycle cover. In this case, the set of the cycles constitutes a spanning subgraph of G.

If the cycles of the cover have no edges in common, the cover is called edge-disjoint or simply disjoint cycle cover.

== Properties and applications ==
=== Minimum-Weight Cycle Cover ===
For a weighted graph, the Minimum-Weight Cycle Cover Problem (MWCCP) is the problem to find a cycle cover with minimal sum of weights of edges in all cycles of the cover.

For bridgeless planar graphs, the MWCCP can be solved in polynomial time.

== Cycle k-cover ==
A cycle k-cover of a graph is a family of cycles which cover every edge of G exactly k times. It has been proven that every bridgeless graph has cycle k-cover for any even integer k≥4. For k=2, it is the well-known cycle double cover conjecture is an open problem in graph theory. The cycle double cover conjecture states that in every bridgeless graph, there exists a set of cycles that together cover every edge of the graph twice.

== See also ==
- Alspach's conjecture
- Vertex cycle cover
