= List of ETH Zurich people =

This is a list of people associated with ETH Zurich in Switzerland.

== Nobel Prize winners ==
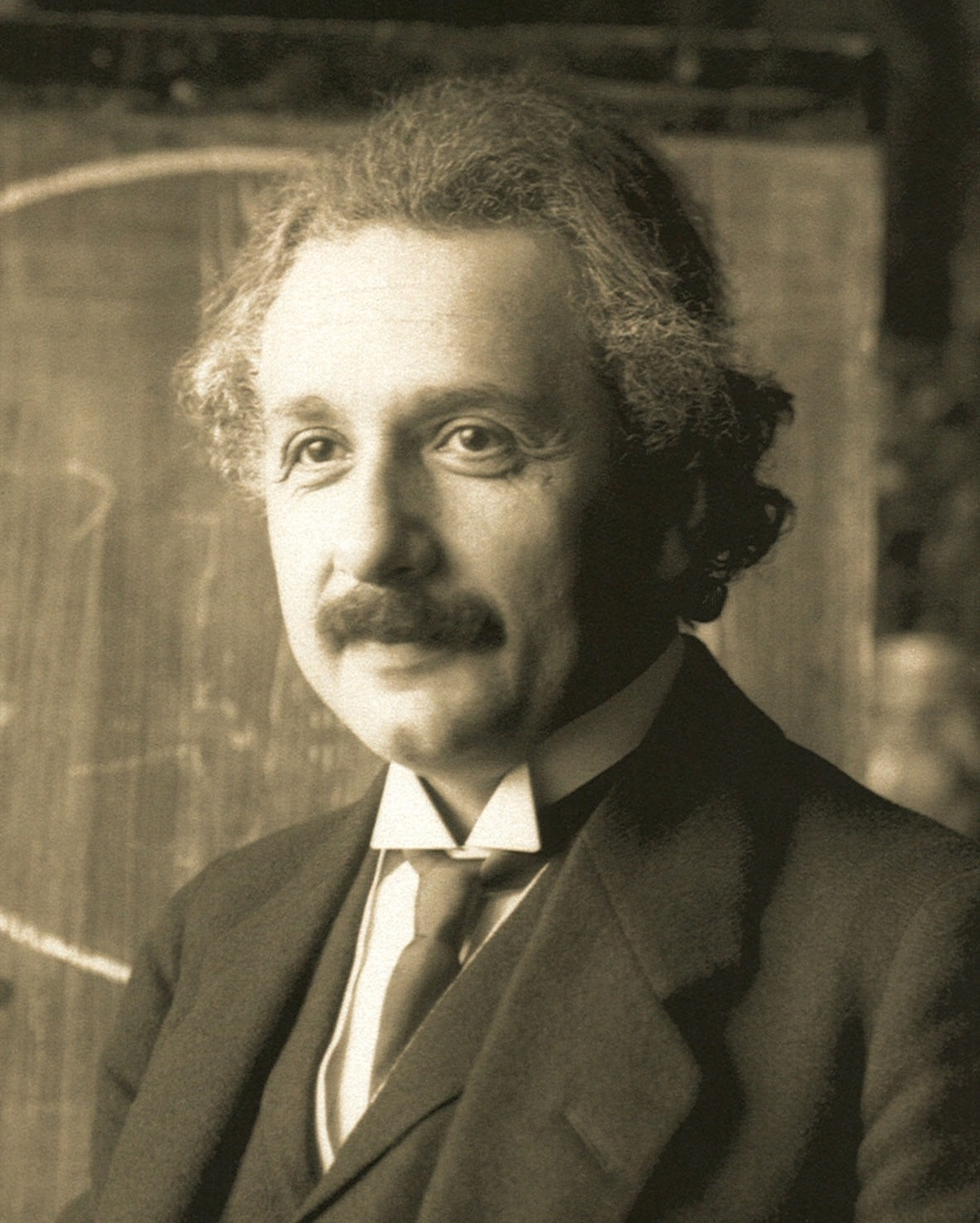
Albert Einstein, 1921

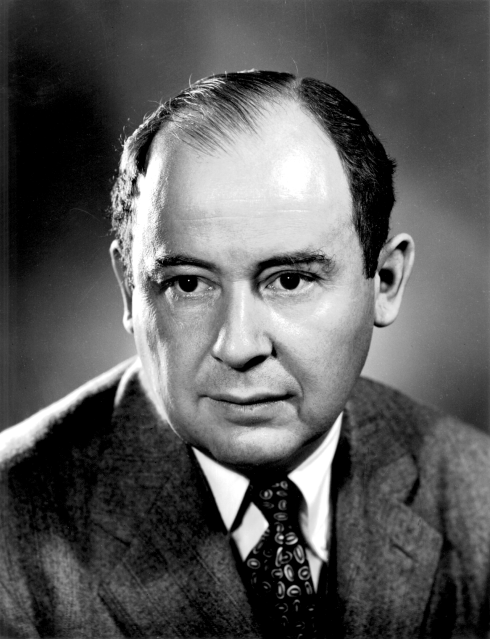
John von Neumann, graduated in chemical engineering, ETH Zurich 1925

The names listed below are taken from the official record compiled by ETH Zurich. It includes only graduates of ETH Zurich and professors who have been awarded the Nobel Prize for their achievements at ETH Zurich.

=== Nobel Prize in Physics ===
- 1901 Wilhelm Conrad Röntgen (graduate)
- 1920 Charles-Edouard Guillaume (graduate)
- 1921 Albert Einstein (student and professor)
- 1943 Otto Stern (lecturer)
- 1945 Wolfgang Pauli (professor)
- 1952 Felix Bloch (graduate)
- 1986 Heinrich Rohrer (graduate)
- 1987 Georg Bednorz (graduate)
- 1987 Karl Alexander Müller (graduate)
- 2019 Didier Queloz (professor)

=== Nobel Prize in Chemistry ===
- 1913 Alfred Werner (graduate)
- 1915 Richard Martin Willstätter (professor)
- 1918 Fritz Haber (attended for one semester)
- 1936 Peter Debye (professor)
- 1938 Richard Kuhn (professor)
- 1939 Leopold Ružička (professor)
- 1953 Hermann Staudinger (lecturer)
- 1975 Vladimir Prelog (professor)
- 1991 Richard Ernst (graduate and professor)
- 2002 Kurt Wüthrich (professor)
- 2010 Richard F. Heck (postdoctoral scientist)

=== Nobel Prize in Medicine ===
- 1950 Tadeus Reichstein (graduate)
- 1978 Werner Arber (graduate)

=== Other Nobel laureates directly affiliated with ETH Zurich ===
- 1912 Nils Gustaf Dalén (in collaboration with Aurel Stodola)
- 1943 George de Hevesy
- 1945 Artturi Ilmari Virtanen (in collaboration with Georg Wiegner)
- 1954 Max Born (in collaboration with Adolf Hurwitz)
- 1964 Konrad E. Bloch (in collaboration with Leopold Ružička and Vladimir Prelog)
- 1968 Lars Onsager (in collaboration with Peter Debye and Erich Hückel)
- 1968 Har Gobind Khorana (in collaboration with Vladimir Prelog)
- 1969 Max Delbrück (in collaboration with Wolfgang Pauli)
- 1987 Jean-Marie Lehn

== Other affiliates ==
=== Architects ===
- Hendrik Petrus Berlage, architect (student of the ETH)
- Roger Boltshauser, architect (professor of the ETH)
- Santiago Calatrava, architect (student of the ETH)
- Max Frisch, architect (student of the ETH)
- Jacques Herzog and Pierre de Meuron (Herzog & de Meuron), architects (students of the ETH, professor at the ETH since 1999, received the Pritzker Prize in 2001)
- Dieter Kienast – landscape architect (professor at the ETH)
- Dimitrije T. Leko (student of the ETH)
- Bruno Reichlin, architect (student of the ETH)
- Fabio Reinhart, architect (student and later Professor at the ETH)
- Aldo Rossi, architect (Professor at the ETH, received the Pritzker Prize in 1990)
- Gottfried Semper, architect (Professor at the ETH)
- Maurus Schifferli, landscape architect (Assistant at the ETH)
- Bernard Tschumi, architect (student of the ETH)
- Günther Vogt, landscape architect (Professor at the ETH)
- Hans Wittwer, architect (student of the ETH)
- Raphael Zuber, architect (student and visiting professor of the ETH)

=== Engineers ===
- Othmar Ammann, civil engineer (student of the ETH)
- Hans Albert Einstein, civil engineer (student of the ETH)
- Eleni Chatzi, civil engineer (Professor at the ETH)
- Torsten Hoefler, computer scientist (Professor at the ETH)
- Karl Culmann, structural engineer (Professor at the ETH)
- Maurice Koechlin, structural engineer (student of the ETH)
- Christian Menn, structural engineer (student of the ETH, Professor at the ETH)
- Jan A. Rajchman, electrical engineer (student of the ETH)
- Rudolf Kálmán, electrical engineer, mathematician (Professor at the ETH)
- Nikola Pašić, civil engineer (student on the ETH)
- Jakob Ackeret, aeronautical engineer (student of the ETH, Professor at the ETH)
- Gabriel Narutowicz, civil engineer, (student of the ETH, president of Poland 1922)
- Wernher von Braun, aerospace engineer (student of the ETH)
- Herbert Einstein, civil engineer (student of the ETH, Professor at MIT)
- Ferdinand Piëch, mechanical engineer (student of the ETH)
- Paul Santorini, civil engineer (student of the ETH)
- Aurel Stodola, mechanical engineer (Professor at the ETH, founder of Laboratory for Energy Conversion)
- Zoltán Spakovszky, computer scientist and electrical engineer (student of ETH)
- Sarah Springman, faculty and rector (2015)
- Peter Uggowitzer, metallurgist (Professor at the ETH)

=== Mathematicians ===
- Lars Ahlfors, mathematician (Professor at the ETH)
- Armand Borel, mathematician, (student of ETH, Professor at the ETH)
- Georg Cantor, mathematician (student of the ETH) Known for: Cantor's Theorem (pure mathematics, set theory)
- Richard Dedekind, mathematician (Professor at the ETH)
- Beno Eckmann, mathematician (student of ETH, Professor at the ETH)
- Alessio Figalli, mathematician (Professor at the ETH, Fields Medal laureate 2018)
- Ferdinand Georg Frobenius, mathematician (Professor at the ETH) Known for: Frobenius method (Differential equations), Frobenius Group (Group theory, Differential Geometry)
- Heinrich Guggenheimer, mathematician, (student of the ETH)
- Peter Henrici, mathematician (Student at the ETH, Professor at the ETH)
- Heinz Hopf, mathematician (Professor at the ETH)
- Adolf Hurwitz, mathematician (Professor at the ETH)
- Marcel Grossmann, mathematician (student of the ETH, Professor at the ETH) Known for teaching Einstein Differential geometry and tensors
- Philippe Kahn, mathematician, entrepreneur, inventor (student of the ETH)
- Martin Maechler, computational statistician, Professor emeritus, known for: co-developer of R
- Mileva Marić, mathematician, (student of the ETH)
- Hermann Minkowski, mathematician (Professor at the ETH) Known for: Minkowski Space (Relativity)
- Jürgen Moser, mathematician (Professor at the ETH)
- John von Neumann, mathematician, computer scientist (student of the ETH)
- Hermann Amandus Schwarz, mathematician (Professor at the ETH)
- Eduard Imhof, cartographer (Student of the ETH, Professor at the ETH)
- George Pólya, mathematician (Professor at the ETH)
- Eduard Stiefel, mathematician (student of ETH, Professor at the ETH)
- Hermann Weyl, mathematician (Professor at the ETH) Known for: Einstein-Weyl group (Quantum Field Theory)
- Wendelin Werner, mathematician (Professor at the ETH, Fields Medal laureate 2006)

== Other fields ==
- Rudolf K. Allemann, biochemist (student and academic at the ETH)
- C. Göran Andersson, physicist (Professor at the ETH)
- Marcel Bucher (born 1963), Professor of Molecular Plant Physiology known for research on plant-fungi symbioses
- Jacob Burckhardt, historian (Professor at the ETH)
- Jean Burelle (born 1938/39), French billionaire, chairman and CEO of Burelle
- C. Marcella Carollo, astronomer (Professor at the ETH)
- Rudolf Clausius, physicist (student of the ETH)
- François Diederich, chemist (Professor at the ETH)
- Paul Feyerabend, philosopher (Professor at the ETH)
- Alfons Baiker, chemist (Professor at the ETH)
- Augusto Gansser, geologist (Professor at the ETH, received Wollaston Medal in 1980)
- David Garcia, computer scientist
- Albert Heim, geologist (Professor at the ETH received Wollaston Medal in 1904)
- Laura Hezner (1862–1916), German geologist, first female lecturer at ETH Zurich
- Kenneth Hsu, geologist (Professor at the ETH, received Wollaston Medal in 1984)
- Rudolf Trümpy, geologist (Professor at the ETH, received Wollaston Medal in 2002)
- Carl Gustav Jung, psychologist, (Professor at the ETH)
- Carlos Kleiber, (orchestral conductor), (studied chemistry at the ETH)
- Princess Gisela of Liechtenstein, businesswoman and wealth manager
- Simon Lilly, FRS, astronomer, (Professor at the ETH)
- Bertrand Meyer, computer scientist (Professor at the ETH since 2001, received the Software System Award in 2006)
- Thomas E. Müller, chemist, Professor at Ruhr-Universität Bochum
- Robert Oppenheimer, physicist (worked with Wolfgang Pauli)
- Michele Parrinello, computational scientist (Professor at the ETH)
- Hanspeter Pfister, computer scientist (student at the ETH, Professor at Harvard University)
- Auguste Piccard, physicist, inventor, explorer (student of the ETH, Professor at the ETH)
- Kevin Schawinski, astronomer (Professor at the ETH)
- Paul Scherrer, physicist, co-founder of CERN and Reaktor AG (now Paul Scherrer Institute)
- Roland Scholl, chemist (studied chemistry at the ETH)
- Wolfgang Seiler, climatologists, (habilitation at ETH Zurich, worked with Paul Crutzen)
- Valentine Telegdi, physicist (student of the ETH, Professor at the ETH, received the Wolf Prize in 1991)
- Rudolf Trumpy, geologist (Professor at the ETH, received Wollaston Medal in 2002)
- Kārlis Ulmanis, politician (student of the ETH)
- Sir Brian Vickers, literary scholar (Emeritus Professor at the ETH)
- Lutz Wingert, philosopher, (Professor at the ETH)
- Niklaus Wirth, computer scientist (Professor at the ETH since 1968, received the Turing Award in 1984)
- Fritz Zwicky, astronomer, (student of ETH, received the Gold Medal of the Royal Astronomical Society in 1972)
- Leo Sternbach, chemist, (worked with Leopold Ružička) Known for: first synthesis of benzodiazepines
- Albert Eschenmoser, chemist, (worked with Leopold Ružička) Known for: critical contributions to synthesis of Vitamin B12, received Wolf Prize in Chemistry

== Leadership ==
=== Rector ===
- Günther Dissertori March 2022
- Sarah Springman January 2015 - February 2022
- Lino Guzzella 2013 – December 2014
- Heidi Wunderli-Allenspach September 2007 - August 2013
- Konrad Osterwalder 1995 - September 2007
- Hans Von Gunten 1987-1995
- Walter Traupel 1961 - 1965
- Albin Herzog 1895-1899

=== President ===
- Joël Mesot January 2019
- Lino Guzzella January 2015 - December 2018
- Ralph Eichler September 2007 – December 2014
- Konrad Osterwalder President Pro Tempore November 2006 – September 2007
- Ernst Hafen December 2005 – November 2006

== See also ==
- ETH Zurich
- Category:ETH Zurich alumni
- Category:Academic staff of ETH Zurich
- List of people from Zürich
