= Wenk =

Wenk is a surname. Notable people with this name include:

- Alexandra Wenk (born 1995), German swimmer
- Carola Wenk (born 1973), German-American computer scientist
- Erich Wenk (1923–2012), German opera singer
- Eduard Wenk (1907–2001), Swiss geologist, petrographer, and mineralogist
- Friedrich Wenk, founder of 1920s German aircraft company Weltensegler
- Hans-Rudolf Wenk (born 1941), Swiss mineraloger and geophysicist
- Karl Wenk (born 1934), German sports shooter
- János Wenk (1894–1962), Hungarian swimmer and water polo player
- John Wenk (born 1938), British middle-distance runner
- Martin Wenk, musician in Calexico (band)
- Richard Wenk, American film screenwriter and director
- Stefan Wenk (born 1981), German javelin thrower

== See also ==
- Wenck
- WENK, a radio station in Tennessee
