= Gustav Steinmann Medal =

German scientific award in geology and geoscience

The Gustav-Steinmann-Medaille is a scientific award by the Deutsche Geologische Gesellschaft - Geologische Vereinigung (German Geological Society-Geological Association) to an individual who has made outstanding contributions in the fields of geology and earth sciences. The award is named after the German geologist and paleontologist Gustav Steinmann.

== Laureates ==
The medal has been awarded each year to the following scientists:

- 2026 Ulf Linnemann
- 2025 Alexander Cruden
- 2024 Lothar Ratschbacher
- 2023 Donald Dingwell, Ralf Littke
- 2022 Janos Urai
- 2021 Mark Handy
- 2020 Gerhard Bohrmann
- 2019 C. Page Chamberlain
- 2018 Kaj Hoernle
- 2017 Manfred Strecker
- 2016 André Freiwald
- 2015 Onno Oncken
- 2014 Antje Boetius
- 2013 Bernhard Stöckhert
- 2012 Hans-Ulrich Schmincke
- 2011 Daniel Bernoulli
- 2010 Celâl Şengör
- 2009 Michael Sarnthein
- 2008 Judith Ann McKenzie
- 2007 Stefan M. Schmid
- 2006 Alfred Kröner
- 2005 Horst D. Schulz
- 2004 Erwin Suess
- 2003 Werner Schreyer
- 2002 Wolfgang Schlager
- 2001 Roland von Huene
- 2000 Erik Flügel
- 1999 German Müller
- 1998 Rudolf Trümpy
- 1998 Wolfgang H. Berger
- 1997 Peter Giese
- 1996 Dieter Meischner
- 1995 Stephan Mueller
- 1994 Adolf Seilacher
- 1993 Hans Peter Laubscher
- 1992 Alfred G. Fischer
- 1991 Viktor Yefimovich Khain
- 1990 Hans Füchtbauer
- 1989 Dietrich Welte
- 1988 Ihsan Ketin
- 1987 Albert W. Bally
- 1985 Eugen Seibold
- 1984 Wolf von Engelhardt
- 1982 Adolf Watznauer
- 1982 Augusto Gansser
- 1980 Henno Martin
- 1978 Eduard Wenk
- 1977 Martin Schwarzbach
- 1975 Willem P. de Roever
- 1974 Hermann Schmidt
- 1973 Dimitrij Andrusov
- 1972 Georg Fischer
- 1971 Kalervo Rankama
- 1971 Kurd von Bülow
- 1968 Ernst Cloos
- 1966 Philip Henry Kuenen
- 1965 Roland Brinkmann
- 1965 Alfred Rittmann
- 1963 Erich Bederke
- 1961 Eugène Raguin
- 1960 Pierre Pruvost
- 1960 Herbert H. Read
- 1959 Eugen Wegmann
- 1958 Curt Dietz
- 1957 Carl Wilhelm Correns
- 1956 Hendrik A. Brouwer
- 1954 Serge von Bubnoff
- 1951 Hans Stille
- 1950 Bruno Sander
- 1949 Maurice Lugeon
- 1947 Johannes Wanner
- 1947 Alfred Philippson
- 1943 Helge Götrik Backlund
- 1939 Otto Ampferer
- 1938 Ernst Zimmermann

== See also ==
- List of geology awards
