= OPmobility =

French automotive supplier

- Type: Société anonyme
- Traded as: Euronext: POM; CAC Mid 60 Component
- Industry: Automobile
- Founded: 1946
- Founder: Pierre Burelle
- Headquarters: Levallois, France
- Area served: Worldwide
- Key people: Laurent Burelle (Chairman and CEO)
- Revenue: ▲€11.40 billion (2023)
- Operating income: ▲€395 million (2023)
- Net income: ▼€163 million (2023)
- Total assets: 7,549,000,000 (2023)
- Number of employees: 31,000
- Parent: Burelle
- Website: opmobility.com

OPmobility is a French automotive supplier. OPmobility operated under the name Plastic Omnium until March 27, 2024.

Logo before March 27, 2024

== History ==
Plastic Omnium was founded by Pierre Burelle in 1946. It began making plastic steering columns for Renault, but soon extended its supply contracts to other carmakers in France and abroad. In 1995, it made a tender offer for its most important rival in the French industry, Reydel, and then acquired it from its major stakeholder Compagnie Financière de Turenne. According to their website, Plastic Omnium currently has 131 plants and is present in 26 countries.

== Divisions ==
=== Plastic Omnium Automobile ===
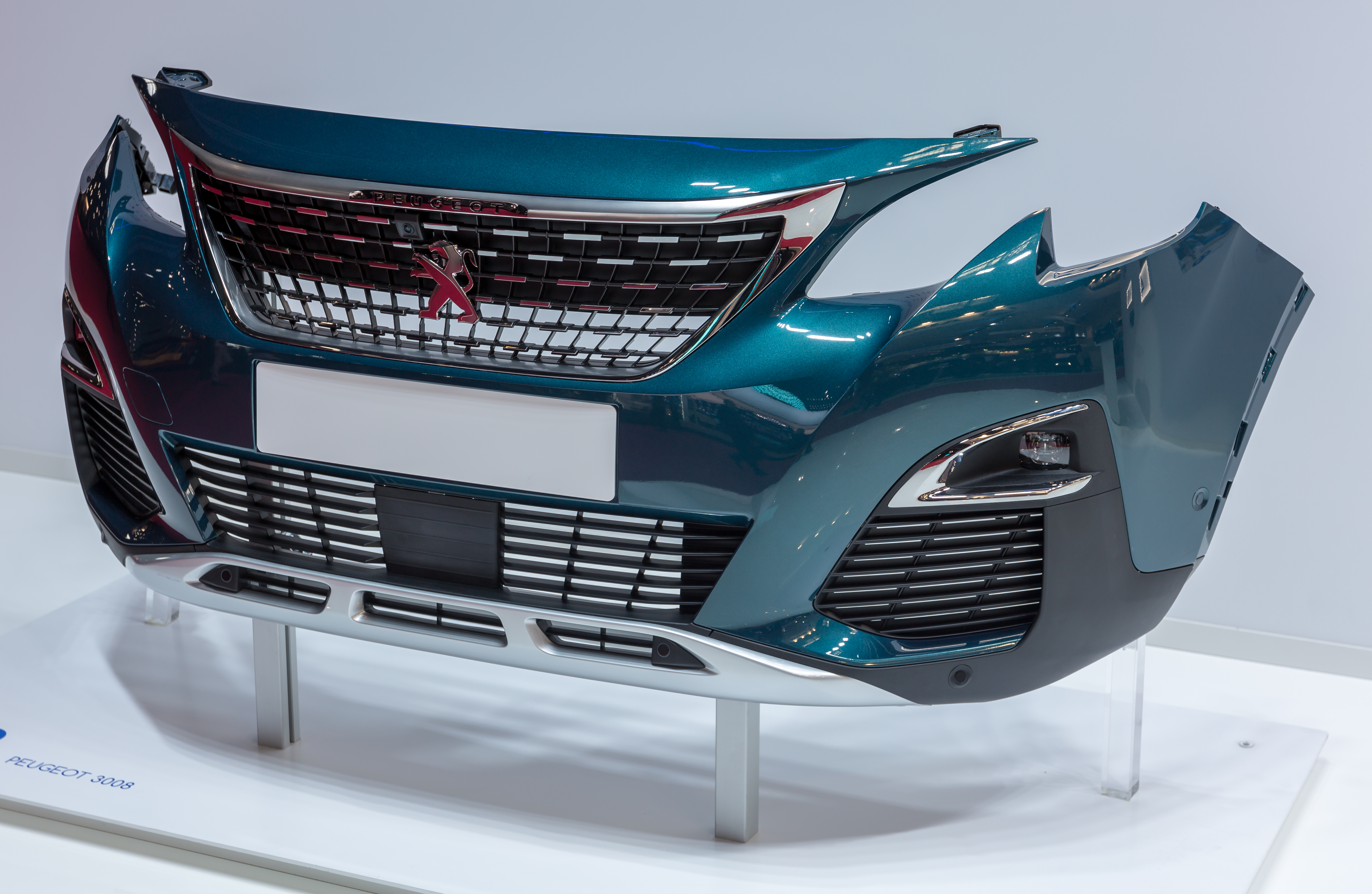
Front module for a Peugeot 3008 made by Plastic Omnium

Two automotive divisions, Auto Exterior Division and Auto Inergy Division (previously: Inergy Automotive Systems). The first provides external plastic elements (thermoplastic and composite) for cars, like bumpers and energy absorption systems, fender and front-end modules. The second provides plastic fuel tank systems and SCR tank systems. In 2011, Inergy purchased the Ford Motor Company's fuel tank manufacturer in United States, Visteon, and became its sixth largest world provider. The company has plans to introduce more composite materials to reduce the weight of their pieces and gain market advantage.

=== Plastic Omnium Environment (now called Sulo) ===
This centers on waste containerization, urban and road signage and urban planning. Its products include wheeled bins; underground, semi-underground, and aboveground containers; voluntary waste drop-off receptacles and data management systems; equipment for community-use area; urban signage solutions; and road signage solutions, as well as sorted waste services. Plastic Omnium Systemes Urbains in 2012 won its first major contract for its line of sustainable products, when Rio de Janeiro requested the provision of wheeled rubbish bins made with plant-based polyethylene derived from sugar cane. The entity was sold to investors in 2018 and is now called Sulo.

== Company's share structure ==
According to Plastic Omnium, at the end of 2011 55.1 percent of it was owned by the parent company, Burelle, 1.6 by the employees, 8.7 was Treasury stock and a 34.6 was for public trade.
