= Great Dying (disambiguation) =

The Great Dying is a colloquial name for the Permian–Triassic extinction event.

Great Dying may also refer to:

- The Great Dying: Cosmic Catastrophe, Dinosaurs and the Theory of Evolution, a 1986 book by Kenneth Hsu
- A name for the impact of the European colonization of the Americas; see Population history of the Indigenous peoples of the Americas

== See also ==
- Great Mortality, or Great Death; alternative names for the Black Death
