= Judith McKenzie =

Judith McKenzie may refer to:

- Judith McKenzie (archaeologist) (1957–2019), specialist in the art and archaeology of the Middle East
- Judith Ann McKenzie (born 1942), biogeochemist known for her research on past climate change, chemical cycles in sediments, and geobiology
