= Ernst Cloos =

German-American geologist

Ernst Cloos (May 17, 1898, Saarbrücken, Saarland – May 24, 1974, Baltimore, Maryland) was a German-American geologist, known as an outstanding structural geologist and a leading expert on the geology of the central Appalachians.

== Biography ==
Ernst Cloos, the younger brother of the well-known geologist Hans Cloos (1885–1951), grew up in Cologne and Freiburg. At age 14 he was sent to Switzerland to study at the Swiss Hermann Lietz-Schule, where he excelled as a student. At age 17 he volunteered for Germany military service in WW I. He became the pilot of an observation plane. On patrol over France near the Swiss border, his biplane was severely damaged by machine-gun fire from four enemy aircraft. Cloos managed to crash-land in Switzerland but the observer in his biplane was killed. The bullet-riddled biplane was put into a Swiss museum. At the end of WW I, Cloos was released from internment in Switzerland and began the study of biology at the University of Freiburg. He soon decided to study geology instead of biology and transferred to the University of Breslau, where his brother Hans was a professor of geology. In 1923 Ernst Cloos received his doctorate with a dissertation on the granites and gneisses of Bohemia. The dissertation is based upon research using methods of granite tectonics pioneered by Hans Cloos. At Breslau, Ernst met a classmate, Robert Balk (1899–1955), who became a lifelong friend of the Cloos brothers and later became a professor of geology in the USA. After completing his doctorate, Ernst Cloos worked with Hans Stille in Göttingen. A possible assistant position was not funded because of severe financial problems during the inflationary period of the Weimar Republic. Ernst Cloos worked as exploration seismologist for Ludger Mintrop's Seismos company on the Gulf Coast of Texas and Louisiana and later in the deserts of Iraq.

In 1930 Ernst Cloos received a research grant from the German government to apply the methods of granite tectonics in the Sierra Nevada. This research made him known in the USA. In 1931 he received a teaching position as a lecturer at Johns Hopkins University, where he began to work on the geology of the Appalachian Mountains in Maryland. He used his brother's methods from granite tectonics and new methods in structural petrology (petrofabric analysis) introduced by Bruno Sander. Cloos also learned petrographic methods that had been established at Johns Hopkins University since the professorship there of George Huntington Williams (1856–1894). Cloos taught himself by using notebooks and collections of rocks and thin sections made by Williams. Cloos preferred to give his lectures in the form of field trips. He and his students did tectonic experiments with clay models. At Johns Hopkins University, he became in 1937 an associate professor and in 1941 a full professor. From 1952 to 1963 he chaired the geology department — during those years he recruited Francis J. Pettijohn and Aaron C. Waters. Cloos retired as professor emeritus in 1968 but remained active in field trips and research.

Cloos was elected in 1950 a member of the National Academy of Sciences and in 1954 a member of the American Philosophical Society. From 1951 to 1954 he chaired the Geology and Geography Division of the National Research Council — during those years he spent almost every Friday in Washington, DC. For the academic year 1953–1954 he was president of the Geological Society of America. He was elected a foreign member of the Finnish Academy of Sciences. For the academic year 1955–1956 he was a Guggenheim Fellow. In 1968 he received the Gustav Steinmann Medal. According to the laudatio, the medal was awarded to him because he, auf kleintektonischen Untersuchungen aufbauend, in beispielgebender Weise die endogene Formung der Erdkruste erforschte (based on small-scale tectonic investigations, researched in an exemplary manner the endogenous formation of the Earth's crust).

He was married in 1923 to Margaret Spemann, the daughter of his Freiburg biology professor Hans Spemann. Margaret Cloos (born in 1898) became an active member of the Quakers in Baltimore. Ernst and Margaret Cloos were the parents of two daughters, Gisela (born in 1928) and Veronica (born in 1931). Gisela Cloos married the geologist William R. Evitt (1923–2009) and had three sons.

== Selected publications ==
- Cloos, Ernst; Hershey, H. Garland (1936). "Structural Age Determination of Piedmont Intrusives in Maryland". Proceedings of the National Academy of Sciences. 22 (1): 71–80. Bibcode:1936PNAS...22...71C. doi:10.1073/pnas.22.1.71. PMC 1076708. PMID 16588048.
- —— (1940). "Crustal shortening and axial divergence in the Appalachians of southeastern Pennsylvania and Maryland". Geological Society of America Bulletin. 51 (6): 845–871. Bibcode:1940GSAB...51..845C. doi:10.1130/GSAB-51-845.
- ——; Hietanen, Anna Martta (1941). Geology of the "Martic Overthrust" and the Glenarm Series in Pennsylvania and Maryland. Special Publications, vol. 35. Geological Society of America. ISBN 9780813720357. LCCN 42006736; 207 pages
- —— (1946). Lineation: A Critical Review and Annotated Bibliography. Geological Society of America. ISBN 9780813710181. LCCN 47000133.
- —— (1947). "Oölite Deformation in the South Mountain Fold, Maryland". Geological Society of America Bulletin. 58 (9): 843–917. doi:10.1130/0016-7606(1947)58[843:ODITSM]2.0.CO;2. ISSN 0016-7606. (dealing with deformation of ooliths by tectonic stresses at the formation of the Appalachians)
- —— (1947). "Boudinage". Transactions, American Geophysical Union. 28 (4): 626. Bibcode:1947TrAGU..28..626C. doi:10.1029/TR028i004p00626.
- —— (1955). "Experimental Analysis of Fracture Patterns". Geological Society of America Bulletin. 66 (3): 241. doi:10.1130/0016-7606(1955)66[241:EAOFP]2.0.CO;2. ISSN 0016-7606.
- —— (1965). "Appalachenprofil 1964". Geologische Rundschau. 54 (2): 812–834. Bibcode:1965GeoRu..54..812C. doi:10.1007/BF01820757. S2CID 198136936.
- —— (1968). "Experimental Analysis of Gulf Coast Fracture Patterns". AAPG Bulletin. 52 (3): 420–444. doi:10.1306/5D25C2E5-16C1-11D7-8645000102C1865D. (received the AAPG's President's Award; over 350 citations)
- —— (1971). Microtectonics Along the Western Edge of the Blue Ridge, Maryland, and Virginia. Studies in Geology, no. 20. Johns Hopkins University Press. pp. xvi+234 pages. ISBN 080181281X. LCCN 77156828.
- ——; Pettijohn, F. J. (1973). "Southern Border of the Triassic Basin, West of York, Pennsylvania: Fault or Overlap?". Geological Society of America Bulletin. 84 (2): 523. Bibcode:1973GSAB...84..523C. doi:10.1130/0016-7606(1973)84<523:SBOTTB>2.0.CO;2. ISSN 0016-7606.
