= Göran Andersson =

Göran Andersson may refer to:

- Göran Andersson (sailor, born 1939) (1939–2020), sailor representing Sweden in the 1960 Summer Olympics
- Göran Andersson (sailor, born 1956) (born 1956), sailor representing Sweden in the 1980 Summer Olympics
- C. Göran Andersson (born 1951), Swedish academic
