= Eduard Wenk =

Swiss geologist and mineralogist (1907–2001)

Eduard Jean Louis Wenk (4 November 1907, Basel – 19 October 2001, Basel) was a Swiss geologist, petrographer, and mineralogist.

== Biography ==
As a teenager, Wenk was keenly interested in the paleontology and botany of the Swiss Jura. He studied as an undergraduate and graduate student (1930 to 1934) at the University of Basel. There he was influenced by Heinrich Preiswerk-Becker (1876–1940), for whom he carried out field work in the Central Alps in 1929. Wenk's 1934 Ph.D. dissertation, with Max Reinhard (1882–1974) as Doktorvater, is entitled Beiträge zur Petrographie und Geologie des Silvretta-Kristalls (Contributions to the petrography and geology of the crystalline rocks of the Silvretta Alps). During a visit to Bruno Sander in Innsbruck, Wenk learned the methods of structural petrology. As a postdoc under Helge Backlund (1878–1958), he studied from 1934 to 1935 at the University of Uppsala. There he also met Jakob Johannes Sederholm, Caesar Eugen Wegmann (1896–1982), Pentti Eskola, and Thomas "Tom" F. W. Barth (1899–1971). Wenk then joined Lauge Koch's expedition to Greenland, which was followed by six Danish East Greenland expeditions in the 1950s. From 1936 to 1939 he worked for Royal Dutch Shell as a petroleum geologist in Borneo.

In 1939, in the Netherlands, he married Martha Heussi (a native of Glarus, Switzerland). The couple met during his work in the Silvretta Alps. Under dangerous circumstances, she travelled to meet him on the day in WW II that Germany invaded the Netherlands. The couple soon returned to Switzerland. He worked with Paul Niggli at ETH Zurich. In 1943 Wenk received his habilitation at the University of Basel. In 1952 he became a professor ordinarius at the University of Basel, where he retired in 1975 as professor emeritus. He was a visiting professor in 1966 at Panjab University in Chandigarh and in 1967 at U. C. Berkeley. During 1970–1971, he was temporarily rector of the University of Basel.

Bsed upon his work from 1934 to 1935 in Uppsala, Eduard Wenk published a classic paper Zur Genese der Bändergneise von Ornö Huvud (On the genesis of banded gneiss of the Ornö headland) dealing with the formation of banded gneisses from metamorphic differentiation. Based on his work on petroleum, petrographic and structural petrology, he recognized, as early as 1943, the relatively young age of metamorphic crystallization in the Central Alps. He created the basis for maps of mineral isograds in the Alps — especially plagioclase isograds. This work also resulted in the 1967 book Die optische Orientierung der Plagioklase.

... in the field, around the evening camp fire, he always had everyone‘s full attention when he told his fascinating stories of adventures with tigers at Borneo, polar bears in Greenland and horrible thunderstorms in the mountains.

Eduard and Martha Wenk had two sons, Hans-Rudolf and Caspar. Hans-Rudolf Wenk became a crystallographer and geologist and wrote several papers with his father.

== Awards and honours ==
In 1970, Eduard Wenk received the German Mineralogical Society's Abraham Gottlob Werner Medal. In 1978 he received the Gustav Steinmann Medal for fundamental work on the metamorphism of the Central Alps — this work led to the understanding of what is now a classic metamorphic belt. In 1962 he was elected a foreign member of the Geological Society of London.

The mineral wenkite, discovered in 1962, and two Neogene mollusc species from his Borneo expedition in the 1930s (Tibia wenki, Barbatai wenki) were named in his honour.

== Selected publications ==
=== Articles ===
- Wenk, Eduard (1949). "Die Assoziation von Radiolarienhornsteinen mit ophiolithischen Erstarrungsgesteinen als petrogenetisches Problem". Experientia. 5 (6): 226–232. doi:10.1007/BF02166893. S2CID 44509128.
- Reinhard, Max; Wenk, Eduard (1951). Geology of the Colony of North Borneo. London: H. M. Stationery Office; 160 pages
- Wenk, Eduard; Haller, John (1953). Geological explorations in the Petermann Region, western part of Fraenkels Land, East Greenland: de Danske ekspeditioner til Østgrønland 1947-51. C. A. Reitzel; 47 pages
- Wenk, E. (1963). "Das reaktivierte Grundgebirge der Zentralalpen". Geologische Rundschau. 52 (2): 754–766. Bibcode:1963GeoRu..52..754W. doi:10.1007/BF01821153. S2CID 128614905.
- Wenk, Eduard; Schwander, Hans; Wenk, Hans-Rudolf (1965). "Labradorit von Surtsey" (PDF). Acta Naturalia Islandica. II (5). Reykjavík. (See Surtsey.)
- Wenk, E. (1968). "Antithesis Alps — Himalayas". Bull. Indian Geological Assoc. 1: 33–36.
- Wenk, E.; Wenk, H.-R.; Schwander, H. (1 October 1968). "Bytownite from Cape Parry, East Greenland". American Mineralogist. 53 (9–10): 1759–1764.
- Wenk, Eduard (1970). "Distribution of al between coexisting micas in metamorphic rocks from the Central Alps". Contributions to Mineralogy and Petrology. 26 (1): 50–61. Bibcode:1970CoMP...26...50W. doi:10.1007/BF00373340. S2CID 128896516.
- Bernoulli, Daniel; Laubscher, Hans Peter; Trümpy, Rudolf; Wenk, Eduard (1974). "Central Alps and Jura Mountains". Geological Society, London, Special Publications. 4 (1): 85–108. Bibcode:1974GSLSP...4...85B. doi:10.1144/GSL.SP.2005.004.01.06. S2CID 129463690.
- Streckeisen, Albert; Wenk, Eduard; Frey, Martin (1974). "On steep isogradic surfaces in the Simplon area". Contributions to Mineralogy and Petrology. 47 (2): 81–95. Bibcode:1974CoMP...47...81S. doi:10.1007/BF00372111. S2CID 129567660. 1974
- Bernoulli, Daniel; Laubscher, Hans Peter; Trümpy, Rudolf; Wenk, Eduard (1974). "Central Alps and Jura Mountains". Geological Society, London, Special Publications. 4 (1): 85–108. Bibcode:1974GSLSP...4...85B. doi:10.1144/GSL.SP.2005.004.01.06. S2CID 129463690.
- Wenk, E.; Wenk, H.-R.; Glauser, A.; Schwander, H. (1975). "Intergrowth of andesine and labradorite in marbles of the Central Alps". Contributions to Mineralogy and Petrology. 53 (4): 311–326. Bibcode:1975CoMP...53..311W. doi:10.1007/BF00382446. S2CID 129780602.
- Wenk, Eduard; Wenk, Hans-Rudolf (1984). "Distribution of plagioclase in Carbonate rocks from the Tertiary metamorphic belt of the Central Alps". Bulletin de Minéralogie. 107 (3): 357–368. doi:10.3406/bulmi.1984.7766.
- Wenk, E.; Schwander, H.; Wenk, H. R. (1986). "Alkali feldspar and coexisting plagioclase in metamorphic carbonate rocks from the Central Alps". Neues Jahrbuch für Mineralogie - Abhandlungen. 155 (1): 89–108.
- Ague, Daria M.; Wenk, Hans-Rudolf; Wenk, Eduard (1990). "Deformation microstructures and lattice orientations of plagioclase in Gabbros from central Australia". The Brittle‐Ductile Transition in Rocks. Geophysical Monograph Series. Vol. 56. pp. 173–186. doi:10.1029/GM056p0173. ISBN 0-87590-025-9.
