= Augusto Gansser-Biaggi =

Swiss geologist (1910–2012)

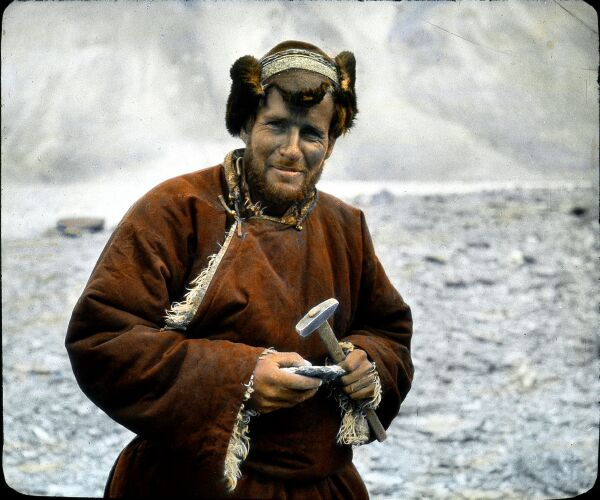
- 9 July 1936, Augusto Gansser is back to India, disguised as a pilgrim.
- Born: 28 October 1910; Milan, Italy
- Died: 9 January 2012 (aged 101); Massagno TI, Switzerland
- Education: ETH Zurich
- Known for: Geology of the Himalayas (1964), Geology of Bhutan Himalaya (1983)
- Awards: Gustav-Steinmann-Medaille (1982)
- Scientific career
- Fields: geology, petroleum geology
- Workplaces: Shell, National Iranian Oil Company; Professor of Geology, ETH Zurich (1958–1977)

Augusto Gansser-Biaggi (28 October 1910 – 9 January 2012) was a Swiss geologist who specialised in the geology of the Himalayas. He was born in Milan.

== Career ==
His geological researches were global in scope:

- East Greenland (1934), a 4-month expedition under Lauge Koch.
- Himalaya (1936), an 8-month expedition under Arnold Heim.
- Colombia (1937–1945, for Shell)
- Trinidad (1947–1950, for Shell)
- Iran (1951–1958, chief geologist of the National Iranian Oil Company)

He got the Tibetan variant of malaria at the First Swiss Himalaya Expedition, and thereafter a lifelong resistance. He circumambulated Mount Kailash disguised as a pilgrim, discovering at the foot of the mountain the origin of one rock seen in the Indian part of the Himalayas and a sensation: seafloor rocks on its South side (ophiolites). Later on, he interpreted this Indus-Yarlung-Tsangpo Suture Zone (ISZ) as the border between the Indian and the Eurasian Plate.

Iran: using his field notes and relief pictures taken by the Iranian Air Force, he chose a 50x 12 km area. Four drillings were not able to go through a huge salt and gypsum layer. Only Number 5 was successful, the largest known 'wildcat' oil gusher, North of Qom (Iran) on 26 August 1956 (3,000 m deep, 80,000 tons oil/day). The gas got lighted up on 13 September, sometime later the well closed itself.

From 1958 until 1977, he was professor of geology at the University and the Swiss Federal Institute of Technology in Zurich, from where he carried out several researches in the Himalayas (Nepal, India and Bhutan). There were five expeditions between 1963 and 1977 to Bhutan. In 1980 and 1985 he was invited by Deng Xiaoping to Tibet.

Notes: the Greenland expedition included Professor Eugen Wegmann (University of Neuchâtel), Swiss geologists René Masson and Eduard Wenk. The Bhutan expeditions were possible with the help of Jigme Dorje Wangchuks, King of Bhutan and his adviser Fritz von Schulthess.

== Family ==
After the first Himalayan expedition he married Linda Biaggi (Toti) from Lugano. The family has two sons and four daughters: Ursula (1941), Mario (1943), Luca (1945), Manuela (1949), Francesca (1956), Rosanna (1959). He named Pico Toti, Sierra Nevada del Cocuy (Colombia) after his wife following their joint first ascent. She died in 2000 (Alzheimer's disease). Gansser-Biaggi turned 100 on 28 October 2010.

== Awards ==
- Patron's Medal of the Royal Geographical Society in London for the book: “The Geology of the Himalayas“
- Wollaston Medal (the highest award granted by the Geological Society of London).
- Prix Gaudry (the highest award granted by the French Geological Society)
- Gustav-Steinmann-Medaille of the Geological Society of West Germany
- King Albert Medal of Merit for his mountain research
- In 1983 the University of Peshawar in Pakistan gave him the title of "Baba Himalaya" (Father of the Himalayas).
- in 2005 he became honorary member of the Nepal Geological Society.

== Publications ==
- Heim, Arnold; Gansser, Augusto (1938). Thron der Götter: Erlebnisse der ersten Schweizer Himalaja-Expedition. Zürich/Leipzig: Morgarten-Verlag. p. 270. It gratefully acknowledges Sven Hedin's literature about the Himalayas.
- Heim, Arnold; Gansser, Augusto (1939). Central Himalaya Geological Observations of Swiss Expedition, 1936. p. 246.
- Heim, Arnold; Gansser, Augusto (1994). Thron der Götter: Erlebnisse der ersten Schweizer Himalaja-Expedition. Delhi: Book Faith India. pp. XXV, 233. ISBN 81-7303-012-X.
- Gansser, Augusto (1938). "Der Nevado del Cocuy: Columbianisches Bergerlebnis". Die Alpen (8).
- Gansser, Augusto (1962). Lateinamerika - Land der Sorge und der Zukunft. Sozialwissenschaftliche Studien für das Schweizerische Institut für Auslandforschung. Vol. 9. Erlenbach-Zürich/Stuttgart: Rentsch. p. 315.
- Gansser, Augusto (1964). Geology of the Himalayas. London/New York/Sydney: Wiley Interscience. p. 289.
- Markus, Ursula; Gansser, Augusto; Olschak, Blanche Christine (1971). Bhutan: Land of hidden treasures. London: Allen & Unwin. p. 63.
- Gansser, Augusto (April 1973). "Generalised geological map of the Andes 1:20,000,000: Facts and theories on the Andes, Twenty-sixth William Smith Lecture". Journal of the Geological Society, London. 129 (2): 93–131. doi:10.1144/gsjgs.129.2.0093. S2CID 128896984.
- Gansser, Augusto (1973). "Orogene Entwicklung in den Anden, im Himalaja und den Alpen: ein Vergleich". Eclogae Geologicae Helvetiae. 66. Lausanne: 23–40.
- Gansser, Augusto (1974). "The Roraima problem (South America)". Mitteilungen aus dem Geologischen Institut der Eidg. Technischen Hochschule und der Universität Zürich. 177. Zuerich: 80–100. Note: It is about the Guyana Shield, the Tepuys and Mount Roraima.
- Gansser, Augusto (1981). "The Geodynamik History of the Himalaya, in Zagros, Hindu Kush". In Gupta, H. K.; Delany, F. M. (eds.). Himalaya-Geodynamik Evolution. Geodynamik Series. Vol. 3. American Geophysical Union. pp. 111–121.
- Gansser, Augusto (1983). Geology of Bhutan Himalaya. Basel/Boston/Stuttgart: Birkhäuser. p. 181. ISBN 3-7643-1371-4.
- Markus, Ursula; Gansser, Augusto; Olschak, Blanche Christine (1983). Bhutan: Königreich im Himalaja. Freiburg im Breisgau: Atlantis. p. 104. ISBN 3-7611-0652-1.
- Gansser, Augusto (1999). Schalensteine: prähistorische Kult-Objekte. München: Verlag Dr. Christian Müller-Straten. ISBN 978-3-932704-66-6.
