= Othmar Ammann =

Swiss-American civil engineer (1879–1965)

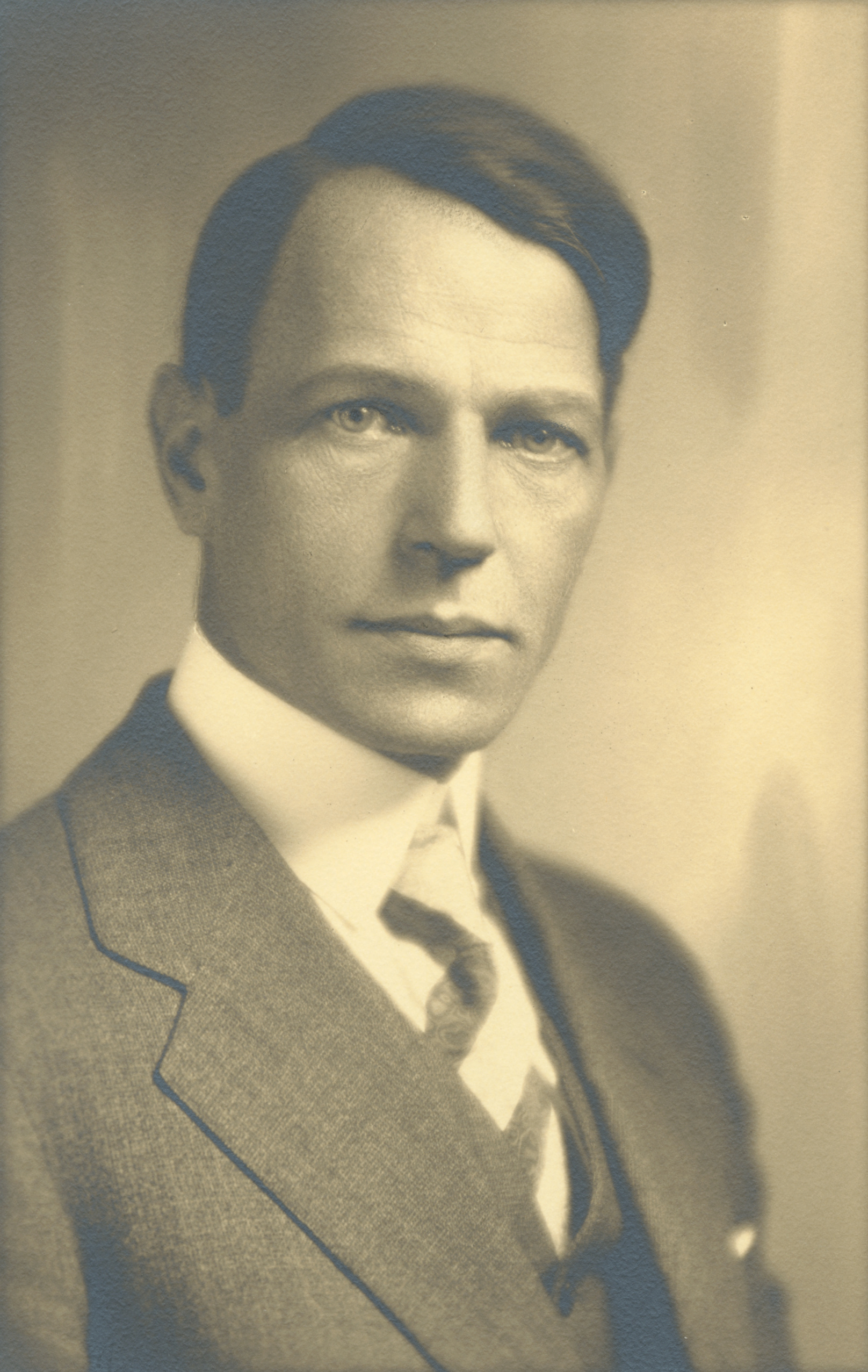
- Ammann in 1932
- Born: March 26, 1879; Feuerthalen, Switzerland
- Died: September 22, 1965 (aged 86); Rye, New York, U.S.
- Education: ETH Zurich
- Spouses: Lilly Selma Wehrli (m. 1905; died 1933); Klary Vogt Noetzli (m. 1935)
- Children: 3
- Engineering career
- Projects: George Washington Bridge, Throgs Neck Bridge, Bronx–Whitestone Bridge, Verrazzano–Narrows Bridge and Bayonne Bridge
- Awards: Thomas Fitch Rowland Prize (1919); National Medal of Science (1964)

Othmar Hermann Ammann (March 26, 1879 – September 22, 1965) was a Swiss-American civil engineer whose bridge designs include the George Washington Bridge, Verrazzano–Narrows Bridge, and Bayonne Bridge. He also directed the planning and construction of the Lincoln Tunnel.

== Biography ==
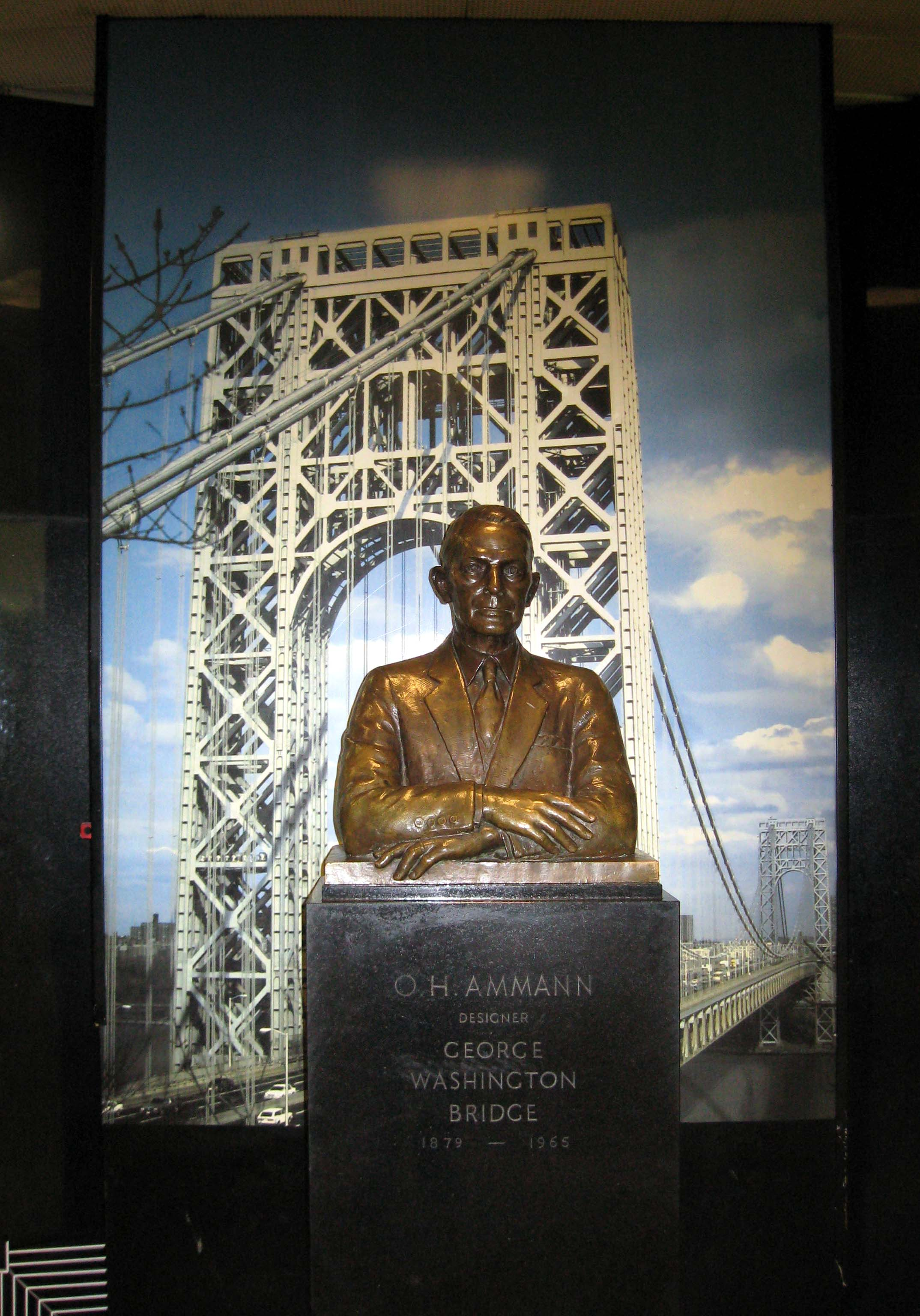
Bust of Ammann in the George Washington Bridge Bus Station, Manhattan (2008)

Othmar Ammann was born near Schaffhausen, Switzerland, in 1879. His father was a manufacturer and his mother was a hat maker. He received his engineering education at the ETH Zurich (known locally as the Polytechnikum) in Zürich, Switzerland. He studied with Swiss engineer Wilhelm Ritter. In 1904, he emigrated to the United States, spending much of his career working in New York City. He became a naturalized citizen in 1924.

In 1905, he briefly returned to Switzerland to marry Lilly Selma Wehrli. Together they had three children – Werner, George, and Margot – before she died in 1933. He then married Klary Vogt Noetzli, herself recently widowed, in 1935 in California.

Ammann wrote two reports about bridge collapses, the collapse of the Quebec Bridge and the collapse of the original Tacoma Narrows Bridge (Galloping Gertie). It was the report that he wrote about the failure of the Quebec Bridge in 1907 that first earned him recognition in the field of bridge-design engineering. Because of this report, he was able to obtain a position working for Gustav Lindenthal on the Hell Gate Bridge. By 1925, he had been appointed bridge engineer to the Port Authority of New York and New Jersey. His design for a bridge over the Hudson River was accepted over one developed by his mentor, Lindenthal. (Lindenthal's "North River Bridge" designs show an enormous, 16+ lane bridge that would have accommodated pedestrians, freight trains, rapid transit, and automobile traffic. The bridge, which would have entered Manhattan at 57th Street, was rejected in favor of Ammann's designs primarily due to cost reasons.)

Ultimately, this became the George Washington Bridge. Under Ammann's direction, it was completed six months ahead of schedule for less than the original $60 million budget. Ammann's designs for the George Washington Bridge, and, later, the Bayonne Bridge, caught the attention of master builder Robert Moses, who drafted Ammann into his service. The last four of Ammann's six New York City bridges – Triborough, Bronx–Whitestone, Throgs Neck, and Verrazzano–Narrows – were all built for Moses's Triborough Bridge and Tunnel Authority.

In 1946, Ammann and Charles Whitney founded the firm Ammann & Whitney.

In 1964, Ammann opened the Verrazzano–Narrows Bridge in New York, that had the world's longest suspended span of 4,260 feet (1,300 m), and was the world's heaviest suspension bridge of its time. The Verrazzano–Narrows Bridge is currently the eleventh-longest span in the world and longest in the Western Hemisphere. Ammann also assisted in the building of the Golden Gate Bridge in San Francisco, currently ranked twelfth.

Due to his reputation, he was chosen as one of three engineers tasked with investigating the 1940 collapse of the Tacoma Narrows bridge. Along with Theodore Von Kármán and Glenn B. Woodruff, he published the 1941 report "The Failure of the Tacoma Narrows Bridge", which guided the next half century of suspension-bridge design.

== Works ==
Ammann was known for being able to create bridges that were light and inexpensive, yet they were still simple and beautiful. He was able to do this by using the deflection theory. He believed that the weight per foot of the span and the cables would provide enough stiffness so that the bridge would not need any stiffening trusses. This made him popular during the depression era when being able to reduce the cost was crucial. Famous bridges by Ammann include the following:

- George Washington Bridge (opened October 25, 1931)
- Bayonne Bridge (opened November 15, 1931)
- Triborough Bridge (opened July 11, 1936)
- Bronx–Whitestone Bridge (opened April 29, 1939)
- Delaware Memorial Bridge (with HNTB, first span opened 1951)
- Walt Whitman Bridge (opened May 16, 1957)
- Throgs Neck Bridge (opened January 11, 1961)
- Verrazzano–Narrows Bridge (opened November 21, 1964)

The George Washington Bridge was originally designed to have its steel structure clad in dressed stone, omitted from the final design due to cost constraints stemming from the Great Depression. Ammann's managerial skills saw the bridge completed ahead of schedule and under budget.

The arched Bayonne Bridge is the only Ammann design that is not a suspension bridge.

The Bronx–Whitestone Bridge had to be reinforced after only one year of operation because of perceptible movement during high winds. Warren trusses were initially implemented to stiffen the bridge, spoiling its classic streamlined looks. They have been removed and the wind problem solved using triangular-shaped lightweight fiberglass aerodynamic fairing along both sides that slices the wind as it passes over the bridge.

In addition to his work on bridges, Ammann also directed the planning and construction of the Lincoln Tunnel.

== Death and legacy ==
Ammann was the recipient of several awards, including the Thomas Fitch Rowland Prize (1919), the Metropolitan Section Civil Engineer of the Year (1958), the Ernest E. Howard Award (1960) and the National Medal of Science (1964).

In 1962, a bronze bust of Ammann was unveiled in the lobby of the George Washington Bridge Bus Station in Manhattan. On Long Island, a residence hall, called Ammann College, was dedicated in his honor on February 18, 1968, on the campus of Stony Brook University. To mark the hundredth anniversary of his birth in 1979, a memorial plaque for Ammann was placed at the intersection of Lily Pond and Major avenues on Staten Island, near the toll plaza of the Verrazzano–Narrows Bridge.

Ammann died at his home in Rye, New York, on September 22, 1965. His funeral would be held at the Frank E. Campbell Funeral Chapel in Manhattan at 81st Street and Madison Avenue with services at the Madison Avenue Presbyterian Church at 73rd Street and Madison Avenue.

== See also ==
- List of civil engineers
- List of ETH Zurich people
- List of naturalized American citizens
- List of people from New York
- List of structural engineers
- Austin Tobin
- Eugenius Harvey Outerbridge
- Christopher O. Ward
