= Daniel Bernoulli (geologist) =

Swiss geologist (born 1936)

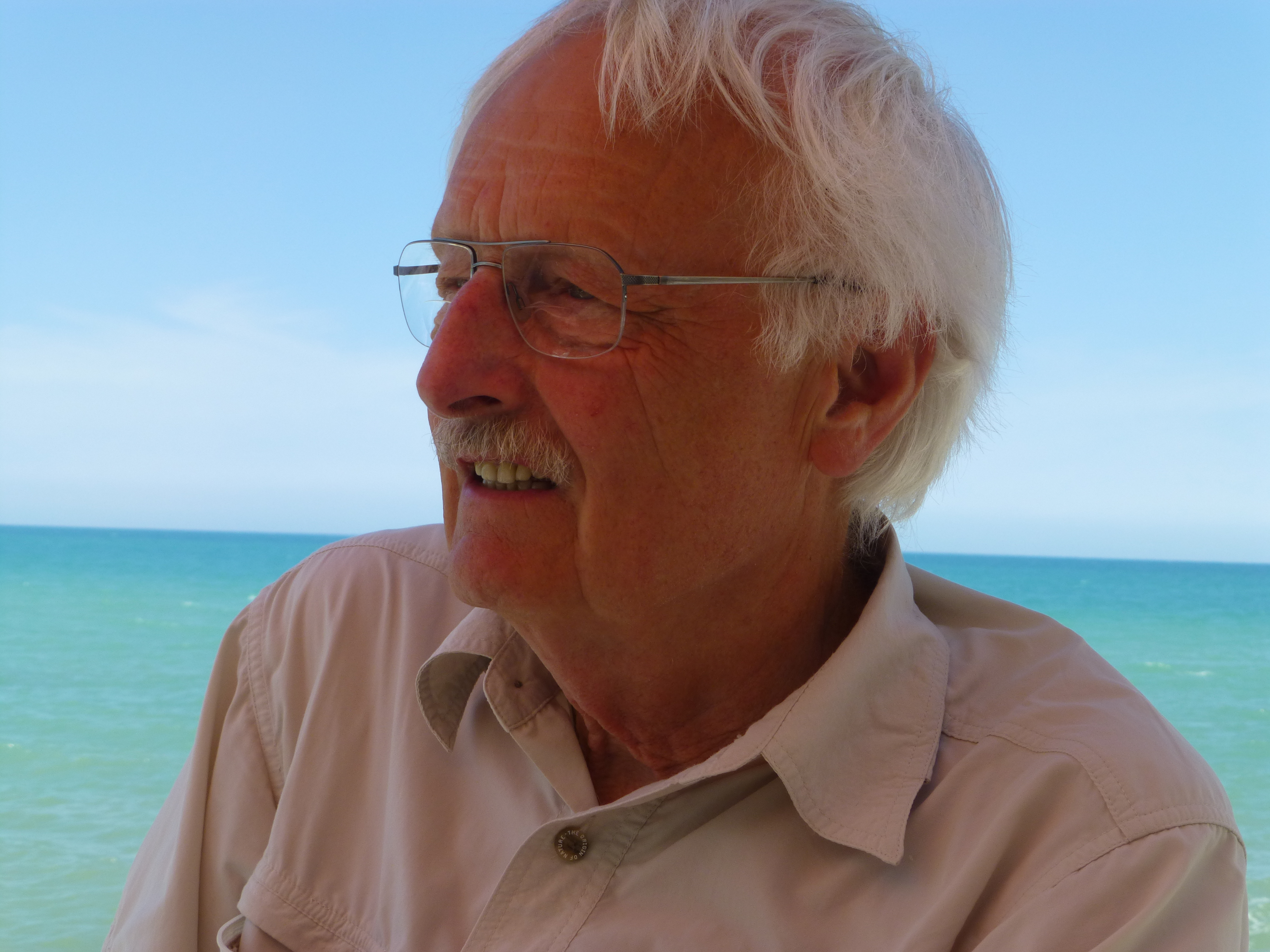
- Born: 11 June 1936 (age 90); Basel, Switzerland
- Education: University of Basel
- Scientific career
- Fields: Geology; Sedimentology; Stratigraphy
- Workplaces: University of Basel; ETH Zurich

Daniel Bernoulli (born 11 June 1936) is a Swiss geologist known for his contributions to sedimentology, stratigraphy and the study of the evolution of continental margins, through comparisons between the sedimentary successions of modern oceans and those preserved in mountain ranges.

== Biography ==
=== Education and academic career ===
A descendant of the Bernoulli family, Bernoulli began studying geology at the University of Basel in 1955. He obtained his doctorate there in 1963 with a thesis on the geology of Monte Generoso, a study published the following year in the series Beiträge zur geologischen Karte der Schweiz. From 1963, the year of his doctorate, until 1967, Bernoulli worked as a geologist for the oil company Shell, carrying out research aimed at reconstructing the sedimentary history of the central Mediterranean Sea in Greece, Yugoslavia, Sicily and the Apennines, as part of a broader oil exploration programme in the Adriatic Sea and south of Sicily. In 1967, he left Shell and returned to the University of Basel as an assistant at the Institute of Geology, obtaining his habilitation in 1970 and becoming an extraordinary professor in 1973. During this period, he contributed to the development of teaching in sedimentology and regional geology at the university.

During the 1970s, Bernoulli also began collaborating with ETH Zurich, particularly with his colleagues Kenneth Hsü and Rudolf Trümpy, continuing his studies on the geological history of continental margins and ocean basins. Subsequently, on 1 October 1986, he took up the chair of geology at ETH Zurich, succeeding Trümpy in the teaching of stratigraphy and sedimentology, a position he held until 2000, when he became professor emeritus.

In 1994, he was elected a foreign member of the Accademia dei Lincei, in the class of physical sciences, geosciences category.

=== Scientific activity ===
Bernoulli's scientific activity focused primarily on sedimentology, stratigraphy and the relationships between tectonic and sedimentary processes, with particular attention to the evolution of continental margins and the reconstruction of ancient ocean basins. He researched plate tectonics by comparing stratigraphic profiles obtained in the Atlantic Ocean by the Deep Sea Drilling Project (DSDP), in which he participated from 1970, focusing particularly on the Mesozoic evolution of the Atlantic and its continental margins, and the subsequent Ocean Drilling Program, with sedimentary successions in the Alps and the Apennines. In 1972, he published a comparative study of Mesozoic facies in the North Atlantic and the Mediterranean, identifying correspondences between oceanic deposits recovered by drilling and sedimentary successions preserved in the Alpine mountain ranges. In 1975, he also participated, together with Hsü, in an oceanographic expedition aboard the Glomar Challenger in the Mediterranean Sea.

Bernoulli's comparative studies of the continental margins of the present-day Atlantic Ocean and the remains of the ancient margins of the Tethys Ocean preserved in the mountain ranges surrounding the Mediterranean involved the formation of the Alps and on the sedimentology of deposits from the pelagic zone, contributing to the resolution of a scientific debate dating back to the previous century concerning the presence of deep-ocean deposits within mountain ranges. Subsequent work conducted with Hugh Jenkyns examined the oceanographic evolution of the western Tethys, applying methods previously developed for the study of modern ocean basins to the geology of mountain ranges. Following these studies, during the 1980s, Bernoulli also carried out field research in the Arabian Peninsula, in the Al Hajar Mountains, conducting stratigraphic analyses that helped clarify the Mesozoic evolution of the Hawasina Basin.

During the 1990s, Bernoulli's main research interest, pursued particularly in collaboration with Gian-Reto Manatschal and Nico Froitzheim, was the identification and study of the remains of transition zones between the continental crust and oceanic crust of the ancient Tethys preserved in the Alps. He also investigated the origin of pelagic sediments overlying oceanic crust and exhumed mantle rocks, as well as processes of resedimentation and diagenesis in deep-marine deposits. During this period, Bernoulli also studied the carbonate platforms of passive continental margins, focusing on sedimentary successions in the Apennines. These were used to analyse the relationships between sequence stratigraphy, sea level changes and tectonic processes, the causes of carbonate platform drowning, and the effects of palaeoceanographic changes on shallow-water marine organisms.

In 1997, the Geological Society of America elected him an honorary fellow for his contributions to understanding the evolution of mountain ranges and the relationships between tectonics and sedimentation along continental margins affected by rifting. In 2006, the Society for Sedimentary Geology awarded him the Francis J. Pettijohn Medal, recognising the importance of his research on continental margins, pelagic sediments and carbonate platforms, as well as his contribution to integrating marine geology, sedimentology and tectonics. In addition, in 2013, the scientific journal Sedimentology dedicated a special issue on Alpine sedimentology to him and geologist Albert Matter, including contributions presented at a 2011 symposium marking the researchers' 75th birthdays.

== Honours and awards ==
- 1974 – Appointed Distinguished Lecturer by the American Association of Petroleum Geologists.
- 1978 – Received the Science Prize of the City of Basel.
- 1997 – Elected an honorary fellow of the Geological Society of America.
- 1999 – Awarded the Prix Prestwich by the Geological Society of France.
- 2003 – Awarded the Leopold von Buch Plaque for his studies on the relationships between sedimentation and tectonics at plate margins.
- 2006 – Awarded the Francis J. Pettijohn Medal by the Society for Sedimentary Geology for his contributions to sedimentology.
- 2006 – Awarded an honorary degree in natural sciences by the University of Lausanne.
- 2008 – Awarded the Capellini Medal by the Italian Geological Society (Società Geologica Italiana).
- 2011 – Awarded the Gustav Steinmann Medal by the Geologische Vereinigung.

== Bibliography ==
- Bernoulli, Daniel (1964). Zur Geologie des Monte Generoso (Lombardische Alpen): ein Beitrag zur Kenntnis der südalpinen Sedimente. Beiträge zur geologischen Karte der Schweiz, Neue Folge (in German). Vol. 118.
- "Daniel Bernoulli, ordentlicher Professor für Geologie". Schweizer Ingenieur und Architekt (in German). 105 (14). 1987.
- "1997 Honorary Fellows Named" (PDF). GSA Today. Vol. 7, no. 10. 1997.
- Schlager, Wolfgang; Eberli, Gregor P. (2006). "Francis J. Pettijohn Medal: Daniel Bernoulli" (PDF). The Sedimentary Record. 4 (4).
- Föllmi, Karl B.; Schlunegger, Fritz; Weissert, Helmut (2013). "Alpine sedimentology: An introduction and tribute to Albert Matter and Daniel Bernoulli". Sedimentology. 60 (1). doi:10.1111/sed.12014.
