= ABB Research Award in honor of Hubertus von Gruenberg =

The ABB Research Award in Honor of Hubertus von Gruenberg is named after Dr. Hubertus von Gruenberg, who was the Chairman of the Board of Directors of the technology company ABB from 2007 to 2015.

== Endowment and format ==
Awarded every three years, the prize is endowed with a research grant of US$300,000. The prize is awarded to a postdoctoral researcher working in the fields of energy, manufacturing, transport, infrastructure, digitalization, or related fields. The grant enables the awardee to continue research on his or her topic for three years.

== Purpose ==
The award was created to sustain high levels of research and encourage the development of future technologies and applications.

== Awardees ==
=== 2016 ===
Dr. Jef Beerten from KU Leuven for his PhD thesis on "Modeling and Control of DC Power Systems"

=== 2019 ===
Dr. Ambuj Varshney from Uppsala University/University of California, Berkeley for his PhD thesis on "Enabling Sustainable Networked Embedded Systems"

== Jury ==
=== 2016 ===
The 2016 jury consisted of

- Prof. Robert Armstrong, Massachusetts Institute of Technology
- Prof. Ulrike Grossner, Swiss Federal Institute of Technology in Zurich (ETH Zurich)
- Prof. Nina Thornhill, Imperial College London
- Prof. Zheyao Wang, Tsinghua University, Beijing
- Bazmi Husain, ABB's Chief Technology Officer
- Dr. Hubertus von Gruenberg, former ABB Chairman

=== 2019 ===
The 2019 jury consisted of

- Prof. Nina Thornhill (Imperial College London)
- Prof. M. Granger Morgan (Carnegie Mellon University Pittsburgh)
- Prof. Roland Siegwart (ETH Zurich)
- Prof. C.L. Philip Chen (University of Macau, Taipa, Macau)
- Bazmi Husain, CTO of ABB
- Dr. Hubertus von Grünberg, former ABB Chairman

=== 2022 ===
The 2022 jury consisted of

- Prof. Ambuj Varshney (National University of Singapore)
- Prof. Nina Thornhill (Imperial College London)
- Prof. Roland Siegwart (ETH Zurich)
- Prof. Manfred Morari (University of Pennsylvania)
- Dr. Bernhard Eschermann, CTO of ABB Process Automation
- Dr. Hubertus von Grünberg, former ABB Chairman
