= Gabriela Hug =

Swiss electrical engineer (born 1979)

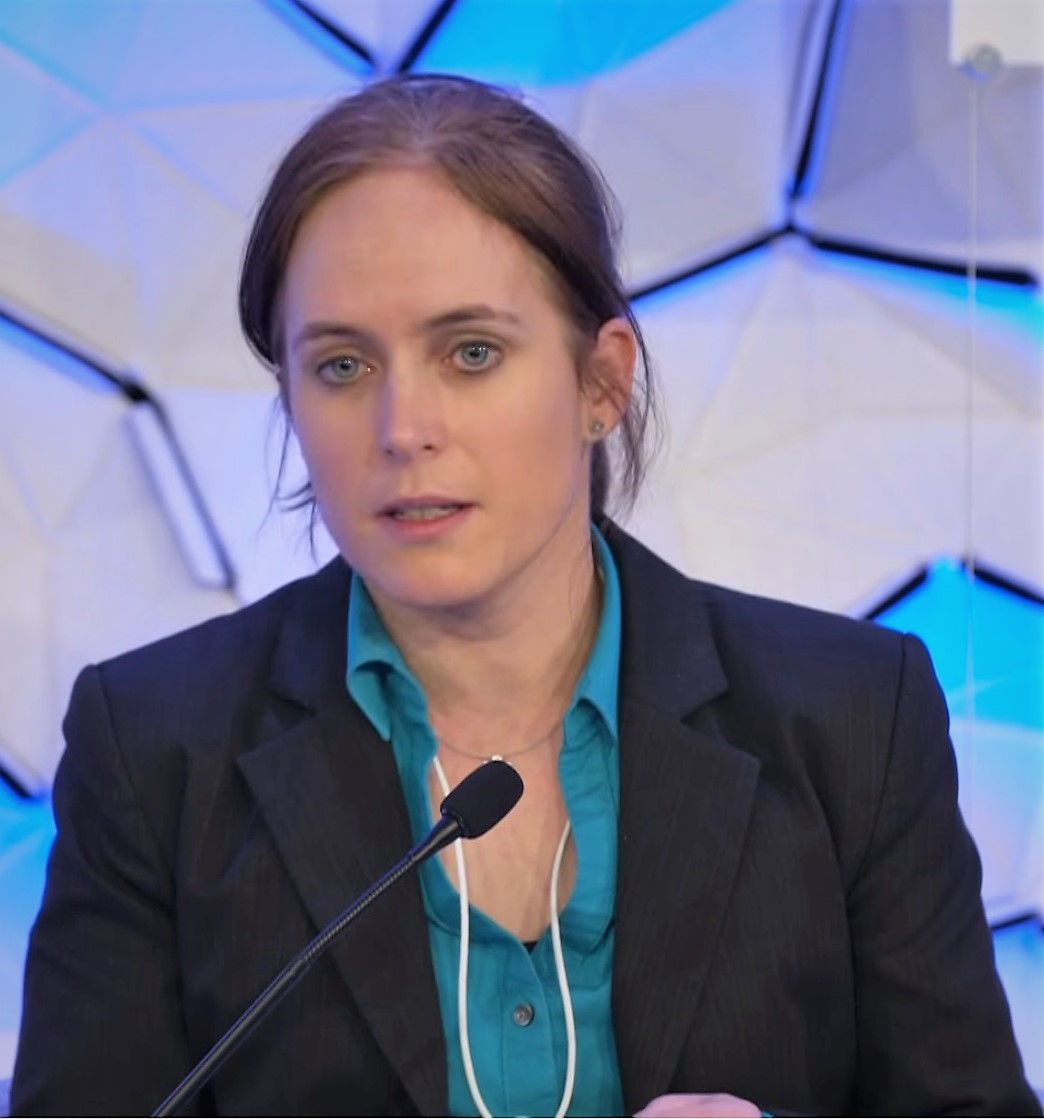
- Hug speaks at the 2018 World Economic Forum
- Born: 1979 (age 46–47); Baden, Switzerland
- Education: ETH Zürich
- Known for: Control and optimization of electrical power systems
- Awards: 2013 IEEE Power and Energy Society Outstanding Young Engineer Award, 2013 George Tallman Ladd Award, 2013 US National Science Foundation Career Award
- Scientific career
- Fields: Electrical Engineering, Electrical Power System
- Workplaces: Swiss Federal Institute of Technology ETH Zürich, Carnegie Mellon University

Gabriela Hug-Glanzmann (born 1979) is a Swiss electrical engineer and a professor and Principal Investigator of the Power Systems Laboratory at the Swiss Federal Institute of Technology (ETH) Zürich within the Department of Information Technology and Electrical Engineering. Hug studies the control and optimization of electrical power systems with a focus on sustainable energy.

== Early life and education ==
In 1999, Hug pursued her graduate studies in Electrical and Computer Engineering at the Swiss Federal Institute of Technology (ETH) in Zürich. She first obtained her Master's in 2004 and then went on to complete her Ph.D. in 2008. During her Master's, Hug worked under the mentorship of Manfred Morari where she conducted research on flexible AC transmission system devices (FACTS) which enable enhanced opportunities to control and optimize power usage in existing and new power lines. Her thesis explored a new way of controlling water level in river power plants. She based her method on Model Predictive Control in order to minimize variations and fluctuations that lead to wasted energy and environmental harm.

Hug then worked in the Power Systems Laboratory during her PhD under the mentorship of Göran Andersson. She explored the methods to determine appropriate settings for FACTS where the considered area of the FACTS is determined by a sensitivity analysis. This simulation with a restricted area allows determination of the state of an energy system in the case of a black out without having to compete a full-load flow simulation of the entire area. While pursuing her engineering degrees, Hug also completed her Diploma in Higher Education Teaching in 2007.

== Career and research ==
Following her graduate training, Hug moved to Canada in 2008 where she worked within the Special Studies Group at Hydro One in Toronto, Ontario. She worked for one year as an Assistant Network Management Engineer. In 2009, Hug joined the faculty at Carnegie Mellon University in Pittsburgh, Pennsylvania as an assistant professor of Electrical and Computer Engineering as well as Affiliated Engineering Professor in Engineering and Public Policy. She also became the co-director of the Electric Energy Systems Group (EESG) at Carnegie Mellon, as well as the leader of the thrust area on Transmission and Distribution Management in the SRC Smart Grid Research Center. At Carnegie Mellon, Hug worked on exploring optimal operation of electrical energy systems in order to explore the best way to distribute energy generation, and store energy within an energy system. Distributed energy generation and storage capacity will enable integration of renewable energy sources and lead to more sustainable, efficient, and flexible energy systems. As such, Hug worked to develop flexible algorithms such that storage devices can be efficiently regulated between storage modes and usage modes.

Since 2015 she has been an associate professor and Principal Investigator of the Power Systems Laboratory at ETH Zürich. Hug also continues to be a Collaborating Professor at Carnegie Mellon in Electrical and Computer Engineering as well as in Engineering and Public Policy. She is also a member of the Carnegie Mellon Electricity Industry Center. Since February 2026, she is the head of the Department of Information Technology and Electrical Engineering.

=== Control and optimization of distributed energy systems ===
Hug emphasizes the need to switch to renewable energy sources to keep the world a hospitable place. She works on exploring ways to address the variability and intermittency of renewable energy generation such that one day we can use various sources of sustainable energy to reliably power the grid. To do this, Hug and her team simulate the grid and determine the optimal decisions in order to combine and distribute energy sources within the grid. Since coordinating the large number of distributed nodes will be quite challenging, Hug has proposed a distributed energy management approach which uses intelligence to balance supply and demand. Hug also shows that distributed cooperative control strategies work to coordinate energy storage systems in the energy grid. These energy storage systems need to be able to charge and discharge at the right times to be effective, so Hug tested the implementation of a distributed cooperative control strategy to manage the energy storage systems. Through simulating her distributed cooperative control strategy, Hug saw that losses can be minimized while supply and demand balance is met.

Since a distributed grid contains a lot of data regarding energy usage, this data has a high potential to be cyber-attacked, so in addition to her energy optimization research, Hug also looks at ways to target and prevent cyber-attack on these energy grid system. She uses algorithms to model an attacker's most likely points of attack and this provides guidance on where the most security and protection is needed in the grid.

== Awards and honors ==
- 2019 ALEA Award - Art of Leadership Award ETH Zürich
- 2015 Eta Kappa Nu Excellence in Teaching Award
- 2014 Raymond John Wean Foundation Career Development Professorship at Carnegie Mellon University
- 2013 George Tallman Ladd Award
- 2013 IEEE Power and Energy Society Outstanding Young Engineer Award
- 2013 US National Science Foundation Career Award
- 2008 ABB Research Award in honor of Hubertus von Gruenberg for her PhD Thesis
- 2005 EtherCAT Technology Group Innovation Award For her Master's Thesis
- 2004 ETH Zürich Medal

== Select publications ==
- Active Distribution Grids Offering Ancillary Services in Islanded and Grid-Connected Mode. Stavros Karagiannopoulos, Jannick Gallmann, Marina González Vayá, Petros Aristidou and Gabriela Hug. IEEE Transactions on Smart Grid, vol. 11: no. 1, pp. 623–633, New York, NY: IEEE, 2020. DOI: 10.1109/TSG.2019.2927299
- Natural gas system dispatch accounting for electricity side flexibility. Conor O'Malley, Stefanos Delikaraoglou, Line Roald and Gabriela Hug. Electric power systems research, vol. 178, pp. 106038, Amsterdam: Elsevier, 2020. DOI: 10.1016/j.epsr.2019.106038
- Data-Driven Local Control Design for Active Distribution Grids Using Off-Line Optimal Power Flow and Machine Learning Techniques. Stavros Karagiannopoulos, Petros Aristidou and Gabriela Hug. IEEE Transactions on Smart Grid, vol. 10: no. 6, pp. 6461–6471, New York, NY: IEEE, 2019. DOI: 10.1109/TSG.2019.2905348
- TDNetGen: An Open-Source, Parametrizable, Large-Scale, Transmission, and Distribution Test System. Nicolas Pilatte, Petros Aristidou and Gabriela Hug IEEE Systems Journal, vol. 13: no. 1, pp. 729–737, New York, NY: IEEE, 2019. DOI: 10.1109/JSYST.2017.2772914
- Demand Response of Ancillary Service From Industrial Loads Coordinated With Energy Storage. Xiao Zhang, Gabriela Hug, J. Zico Kolter and Iiro Harjunkoski. IEEE Transactions on Power Systems, vol. 33: no. 1, pp. 951–961, New York, NY: IEEE, 2018. DOI: 10.1109/TPWRS.2017.2704524
- Integration of Optimal Storage Operation into Marginal Cost Curve Representation. Gabriela Hug. Energy Systems, vol. 7: no. 3, pp. 391–409, Berlin: Springer, 2016.DOI: 10.1007/s12667-015-0163-7
- Using Cascaded Hydropower Like a Battery to Firm Variable Wind Generation. Andrew Hamann and Gabriela Hug. IEEE PES General Meeting, Boston, USA Piscataway, NJ: IEEE, July 17–21, 2016.DOI: 10.1109/PESGM.2016.7741913
- G. Hug-Glanzmann, G. Andersson, “N-1 Security in Optimal Power Flow Control Applied to Limited Areas”, IET Generation, Transmission and Distribution, Vol. 3, Iss. 2, pp. 206 – 215, 2009.
- G. Hug-Glanzmann, G. Andersson, “Decentralized Optimal Power Flow Control for Overlapping Areas in Power Systems”, IEEE Transactions on Power Systems, Vol. 24, No.1, February 2009, pp 327 – 336, 2009.
