= Wenck =

Wenck is a surname. Notable people with the surname include:

- Ewald Wenck (1891–1981), German actor
- Friedrich August Wilhelm Wenck (1741–1810), German historian
- Heinrich Wenck (1851–1936), Danish architect
- Helfrich Bernhard Wenck (1739–1803), German historian
- Paul Wenck (1892–1964), German and American illustrator
- Walther Wenck (1900–1982), German army officer

== See also ==
- Wenk
