= Manuela Darling-Gansser =

Italian food writer and author

- Manuela Darling-Gansser
- Born: 29 December 1950 (age 75); Lugano, Switzerland

Manuela Darling-Gansser (born 29 December 1950) is a writer of food and travel cookbooks. She has written four books.

== Published works ==
Darling-Gansser along with Australian photographer Simon Griffiths has produced three food and travel books published by Hardie Grant Books:

- Under The Olive Tree: Family and food in Lugano and the Costa Smeralda, Italy (2003)ISBN 1-74066-086-2
  - Winner of "The Ligare Book Printers Best Designed Cookbook" prize at the Australian Publishers Association 52nd Annual Book Design Awards, 2003.
- Autumn in Piemonte: Food and travels in Italy's northwest (2005)ISBN 1-74066-308-X
- Winter in the Alps: Food by the fireside (2007)ISBN 1-74066-480-9
- TOP 10 Surviving in Style: Recipes and Instruction for the Beginner Home Chef (2008)ISBN 978-0-646-48419-8
