= Nina Thornhill =

British chemical engineer

Nina Frances Thornhill FREng (born 1953) is a British chemical engineer specialising in process automation. She is a professor emerita in the Imperial College London Department of Chemical Engineering, where she formerly held the ABB/Royal Academy of Engineering Chair of Process Automation.

== Education and career ==
Thornhill read physics at the University of Oxford, earning a bachelor's degree there in 1976. She earned a master's degree in control systems in 1983 from the Imperial College London Department of Electrical and Electronic Engineering, and completed her Ph.D. in 2005 through part-time study at University College London.

From 1976 to 1984, she worked in industry at Imperial Chemical Industries and British Aerospace. She returned to academia in 1984, as a lecturer in the University College London Department of Electrical and Electronic Engineering, where she was promoted to senior lecturer in 1991, and professor in 2003. In 2007 she returned to Imperial College London to take the ABB/Royal Academy of Engineering Chair of Process Automation. She retired as professor emerita in 2021.

== Recognition ==
Thornhill was elected as a Fellow of the Royal Academy of Engineering in 2009, and is a Fellow of the International Federation of Automatic Control.

Imperial College London gave Thornhill the President's Award for Excellence in Research Supervision in 2017.

Thornhill won the Nordic Process Control Award in 2019, for her "novel contributions in research to developing innovative approaches, tools and methods for process monitoring, fault diagnosis and detection and optimal operation of large-scale production facilities".
