= Alfons Baiker =

Swiss chemist specializing in catalysis

Alfons Baiker, 1997

Alfons Baiker (born April 14, 1945 in Zürich) is a Swiss chemist specializing in catalysis. Baiker studied chemistry at ETH Zurich. After obtaining his PhD in 1974 he followed several post-doctoral stays at various universities. In 1989 he became a full professor in catalysis and reaction engineering at ETH where he worked until his retirement in 2010.

== Research ==
Dr. Baiker's research covers a wide range of topics, including: asymmetric catalysis, chiral surfaces, catalytic oxidation, utilization of carbon dioxide in catalytic synthesis, environmental catalysis, reactions in supercritical fluids, flame synthesis of catalysts and in situ spectroscopy of catalytic surface processes.
