= Jean Burelle =

French executive

- Born: 1938 or 1939 (age 87–88)
- Education: ETH Zurich; Harvard Business School
- Occupation: Businessman
- Title: Chairman and CEO, Burelle
- Spouse: married
- Parent: Pierre Burelle
- Relatives: Laurent Burelle (brother)

Jean Burelle (born 1938/39) is a French billionaire, the chairman and CEO of the family-owned company Burelle.

== Early life ==
He is the son of Pierre Burelle, the founder of Burelle. He has a bachelor's degree from ETH Zurich, and an MBA from Harvard Business School.

== Career ==
He and his brother Laurent control 77% of Burelle.

== Personal life ==
Burelle is married, and lives in Paris.
