= Thomas E. Müller =

German chemist and academic

- Occupation: Professor

Academic background
- Education: PhD in noble metal complexes and clusters
- Alma mater: LMU Munich; ETH Zurich; Imperial College London
- Thesis: (1995)

Academic work
- Institutions: University of Sussex; Technical University of Munich; National University of Singapore; University of Tokyo; RWTH Aachen University; Rheinische Fachhochschule Köln; Ruhr-Universität Bochum

Thomas E. Müller is a German chemist and an academic. He is Professor of Carbon source and Conversion at Ruhr-Universität Bochum.

Müller's research focus is in the area of chemical engineering and spans the fields of organometallic and polymer chemistry to reaction and process engineering. He has worked on the development of methods for the production of organic commodity chemicals and polymers and has conducted research on catalytic conversions such as the conversion of alkenes and alkynes to amines by hydroamination. More recently, his work has focused on the field of carbon capture and utilization (CCU), sustainability, hydrogenation of multifunctional molecules and high-performance polymers.

Müller has authored and co-authored numerous peer-reviewed research papers.

== Education ==
Müller enrolled at LMU Munich in 1986 and received an intermediate diploma in chemistry. Following that, he received a diploma in chemistry from ETH Zurich in 1991. Subsequently, he completed his PhD in noble metal complexes and clusters from Imperial College London in 1995 and was appointed as a Research Fellow by the University of Sussex to work on fullerene chemistry, allotropes of carbon and arrays of carbon nanotubes. Later, he accomplished habilitation in 2003 from the Technical University of Munich, focusing on chemical process development, reaction engineering and catalysis, and conceived innovative composite and nanostructured materials mainly for use as catalytically active materials.

== Career ==
Following his habilitation in 2003, Müller started his academic career as a lecturer at the Technical University of Munich. He held a brief appointment in 2005 as an associate professor of Applied Chemistry at the University of Singapore. After joining Bayer MaterialScience AG in 2007 he built the CAT Catalytic Center as part of the industry-academia collaboration with RWTH Aachen University. He was the Head of CAT Catalytic Centre (CAT) from 2007 to 2015. After the carve-out, he continued as catalyst expert at Covestro AG. Later, in 2018 he changed as a professor to Rheinische Fachhochschule Köln for a year. Since 2019, he has been the professor of the chair Carbon Sources and Conversion at Ruhr-Universität Bochum.

== Research ==
Müller's research is focused on catalysis, with a particular emphasis on chemical reaction engineering, polyurethanes and high-performance polymers. He has been issued patents on his research on the development of polymeric materials such as polyether thio-carbonate polyols.

=== Organometallic chemistry ===
During his early research, Müller worked on organometallic chemistry with an interest in the catalytic hydroamination of alkenes and alkynes. His research on the catalytic activity of transition metals in the hydroamination of alkynes revealed that [Cu(CH_{3}CN)_{4}]PF_{6} and group 12 metals salts have a particularly high catalytic activity and that a d8 or d10 electronic configuration is present in all catalytically active complexes. In another research, he analyzed the palladium-catalyzed cyclization of 6-aminohex-1-yne and observed the organometallic complex [Pd(triphos)](CF_{3}SO_{3})_{2} to have the highest catalytic activity and also mentioned that ion-exchanged zeolites are at least as active in the hydroamination of 6-aminohex-1-yne as the corresponding homogeneous catalysts. Later, he observed that the presence of protons drastically increases the rate of hydroamination reactions catalyzed by Lewis acidic metals and that supported Rh(I), Pd(II) and Zn(II) complexes have particularly high catalytic activity and selectivity.

Apart from finding new catalysts for the hydroamination of alkenes and alkynes, Müller has also determined the X-ray crystal structure of the transition-metal catalyst [PdCl(triphos)](CF_{3}SO_{3}) that is active for the intramolecular hydroamination of alkynes and developed novel reaction systems for hydroamination reactions, such as a liquid–liquid two-phase catalytic system which showed efficient results.

=== Polymer chemistry ===
Müller is most known for his work in the polymer industry, especially for his approach towards creating multiple sustainable processes for the synthesis and formation of polymers, including a process for manufacturing polyoxazolidinone polymer compounds. He also proposed a method to synthesize polyether ester carbonate polyols by catalytically adding alkylene oxide, anhydrides and carbon dioxide to an H-functional initiator substance in the presence of a double metal cyanide catalyst. Afterwards, he established a process of creating heterocycle-functional polyoxyalkylene polyols by reacting polyoxyalkylene polyols having unsaturated groups with a heterocyclic compound as well as a method for producing polyether thiocarbonate polyols, multiple bond-containing prepolymers as elastomer precursors, and for the synthesis of polyoxazolidinone compounds.

Müller's has elucidated reaction pathways at the initial steps of trioxane polymerization and provided molecular-level insight which benefits further production and properties of polyoxymethylenes. In addition to that, he introduced a method for substituting ether units in polyether polyols with oxymethylene moieties to obtain hydroxy-terminated polyoxymethylene-co-polyoxyalkylene multi-block telechels. A density functional theory (DFT) study evaluated that the co-polymerization of CO_{2} and ethylene by palladium catalyst is feasible if the ligand set is chosen properly.

=== Carbon dioxide chemistry ===
In the area of carbon dioxide chemistry, Müller has focused on the catalytic conversion of carbon dioxide, facile insertion into metal-oxygen-bonds, and utilization of carbon dioxide in the production of bulk chemicals and technologies related to it. He evaluated the catalytic activity of metal complexes, such as [Cr(babhq)(EtOH)](CF_{3}CO_{2}−) for the reaction of carbon dioxide with epoxides and developed novel technologies for carbon dioxide (CO_{2}) utilization. The research demonstrated that polyether carbonate polyols synthesized from carbon dioxide with customized CO_{2} content are a highly promising approach to producing more sustainable polyurethanes. Studying the activation of carbon dioxide with in situ attenuated total reflection (ATR) - infrared spectroscopy (IR) and density functional theory (DFT) calculations his work revealed insertion of CO_{2} into metal–phenoxide bonds to be facile and into cobalt(III)-oxygen bonds to be exothermic.

=== Anthropogenic carbon cycles ===
In the later part of Müller's career, his research focus shifted to technologies for closing anthropogenic carbon cycles. Carbon is a chemical element with the symbol C and atomic number 6. It is an essential element of life on Earth, forming the backbone of most organic molecules, including DNA, RNA, and proteins, sugars, cellulose and lignin. The carbon cycle is the biogeochemical process by which carbon moves through Earth's various reservoirs, including the atmosphere, oceans, land, and biosphere. Carbon is continuously exchanged between these reservoirs through a variety of processes, including photosynthesis, respiration, decomposition, and fossil fuel combustion. The increase in atmospheric CO_{2} concentration has led to a phenomenon known as global warming, which has consequences for the planet's ecosystems and human societies. In this research, he has evaluated the requirements for establishing anthropogenic carbon cycles that seek to understand, manage and balance the flow of carbon through human activities, such as industrial processes, transportation, and agriculture.

== Selected articles ==
- Müller, T. E., Grosche, M., Herdtweck, E., Pleier, A. K., Walter, E., & Yan, Y. K. (2000). Developing transition-metal catalysts for the intramolecular hydroamination of alkynes. Organometallics, 19(2), 170–183.
- Neff, V., Müller, T. E., & Lercher, J. A. (2002). Continuous hydroamination in a liquid–liquid two-phase system. Chemical communications, (8), 906–907.
- Müller, T. E., Hultzsch, K. C., Yus, M., Foubelo, F., & Tada, M. (2008). Hydroamination: direct addition of amines to alkenes and alkynes. Chemical Reviews, 108(9), 3795–3892.
- Peters, M., Köhler, B., Kuckshinrichs, W., Leitner, W., Markewitz, P., & Müller, T. E. (2011). Chemical technologies for exploiting and recycling carbon dioxide into the value chain. ChemSusChem, 4(9), 1216–1240.
- Elmas, S., Subhani, M. A., Harrer, M., Leitner, W., Sundermeyer, J., & Müller, T. E. (2014). Highly active Cr (III) catalysts for the reaction of CO_{2} with epoxides. Catalysis Science & Technology, 4(6), 1652–1657.
- Tomkins, P., & Müller, T. E. (2019). Evaluating the carbon inventory, carbon fluxes and carbon cycles for a long-term sustainable world. Green Chemistry, 21(15), 3994–4013.
- Hermesmann, M., Grübel, K., Scherotzki, L., & Müller, T. E. (2021). Promising pathways: The Geographic and Energetic Potential of Power-to-X Technologies Based on Regeneratively Obtained Hydrogen. Renewable and Sustainable Energy Reviews 138, 110644.
- Tsiklios, C., Hermesmann, M., Müller, T. E. (2022) Hydrogen transport in large-scale transmission pipeline networks: Thermodynamic and environmental assessment of repurposed and new pipeline configurations. Applied Energy 327, 120097.
- Hermesmann, M., Müller, T. E. Green, turquoise, blue, or grey? Environmentally friendly hydrogen production in transforming energy systems. (2022) Progress in Energy and Combustion Science 90, 100996.
- Hermesmann, M., Tsiklios, C., Müller, T. E. (2022) Environmental Assessment of Climate-friendly Hydrogen Supply Chains–A Trade-off between Capacity Utilization and Transport Distance? Energy 2004, 2965.
- Ghosh, A., Singha, A., Chatterjee, R., Müller, T. E., Bhaumik, A., Chowdhury, B. (2023) Influence of heteroatom-doped Fe-carbon sphere catalysts on CO_{2}-mediated oxidative dehydrogenation of ethylbenzene. Molecular Catalysis 535, 112836.
