= Judith Ann McKenzie =

American biogeochemist (1942–2023)

- Born: May 4, 1942; Pittsburgh, Pennsylvania, U.S.
- Died: August 11, 2023 (aged 81)
- Education: University of Colorado, Boulder; ETH Zurich
- Scientific career
- Thesis: Isotope study of the hydrology and the co-existing carbonate phase from site of recent dolomitization the coastal sabkha of Abu Dhabi, Persian Gulf (1976)

Judith Ann McKenzie (May 4, 1942 – August 11, 2023) was an American biogeochemist known for her research on past climate change, chemical cycles in sediments, and geobiology.

== Education and career ==
McKenzie had an M.S. in chemistry from the University of Colorado, Boulder (1970), studied at Scripps Institution of Oceanography, and earned her Ph.D. from the Institute of Geology at ETH Zurich (1976). McKenzie remained at ETH as a postdoc until moving to the University of Florida Gainesville in 1985 where she was promoted to tenured professor in 1987. She returned to ETH Zurich and was appointed full professor in 1996 and later retired at the end of September 2007.

McKenzie served as president of the International Association of Sedimentologists (2002–2006) and the Geochemical Society (2002–2003). McKenzie has also worked within the International Ocean Drilling Program (IODP), specially within the Swiss contribution to the project and from 2006 to 2008 she presented lectures on the deep biosphere in the distinguished lecture series of the European Consortium for Ocean Research Drilling.

In a 2011 interview conducted by the European Association of Geochemistry, McKenzie reflected on her career arc from her Ph.D. research on the chemistry of dolomites in Abu Dhabi to the research of her final postdoc on the geobiology of the dolomites in the same area. During the interview she noted this shift from focusing solely on the geology of rocks to an additional consideration of the biology of the rocks is reflected in the shift of the community at large.

McKenzie has enabled the ability of students to participate in field work through establishing summer schools within the International Association of Sedimentologists and by establishing the Judith McKenzie field work award for graduate students using funds from the Emile Argand Award she received in 2016. McKenzie received multiple awards (details below) and has shared insight on how to improve the diversity of award winners within geosciences.

== Research ==
McKenzie's research used the sedimentary record to define past climates and change over time. This research partially relies on quantifying stable isotopes of dolomite in Abu Dhabi sabkhas and evaporites in Sicily. She has also examined the impact of biological activity on the carbon and nitrogen isotopic ratio in sediments. Cindy Lee, McKenzie, and Michael Sturm used stable isotopes to examine fluxes in particulate matter in a Swiss lake. In the same lake David Hollander and McKenzie examined the fractionation of carbon isotopes as a potential measure of the past atmospheric carbon dioxide concentrations.

McKenzie's work on the 'dolomite problem', an enigma whereby the past prevalence of dolomite is higher than what is found in modern environments, has recently revealed that dolomite is precipitated by bacteria living under anoxic conditions which was first observed in the laboratory with sulfate-reducing Desulfovibrio, and subsequently with microbes isolated from a coastal lagoon in Brazil and in the coastal sabkha of Abu Dhabi.

== Later life and death ==
McKenzie retired as a full Professor of Earth System Sciences at ETH Zurich in 2007.

Judith Ann McKenzie died on August 11, 2023, at the age of 81.

== Awards ==
- Fellow, American Geophysical Union (1999)
- Rachel Carson Award, American Geophysical Union (2003)
- Jean Baptiste Lamarck Medal, European Geosciences Union (2006)
- Member, Royal Danish Academy of Sciences and Letters (2006)
- Gustav Steinmann Medal, German Geological Society-Geological Association (2008)
- Honorary Member, International Association of Sedimentologists (2015)
- Emile Argand Award, International Union of Geological Sciences (2016)
- William H. Twenhofel Medal, Society for Sedimentary Geology (2017)
