= Walter Traupel =

Swiss mechanical engineer and professor (1914–1998)

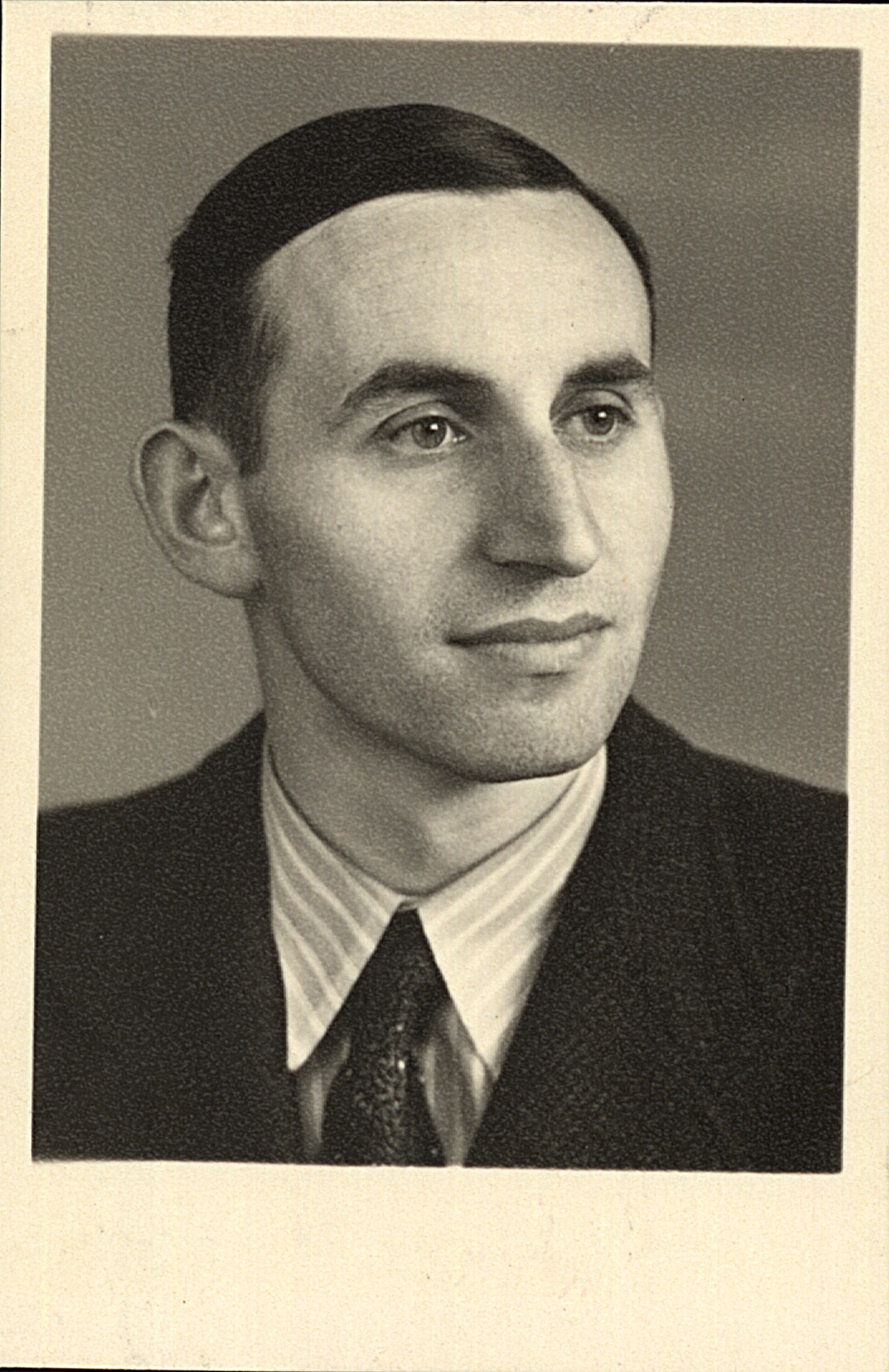
Walter Traupel (ca. 1954)

Walter Traupel (23 April 1914 – 18 August 1998) was a Swiss mechanical engineer and professor at the ETH Zurich. From 1961 to 1965 he was rector of that university.

== Life and career path ==
Traupel studied mechanical engineering from 1933 through 1937 at the ETH Zurich. Then, he joined Sulzer Brothers Ltd. in Winterthur. While working at Sulzer, he completed his doctoral thesis at the ETH Zurich and received his PhD degree in 1942. He was put in charge of the gas turbine department at Sulzer. Traupel made significant contributions to the field of thermal turbomachinery. He was involved in the development of gas turbines and contributed to cycle process designs, flow and heat technical calculations, and stress analysis. He had a lasting influence on the calculation of steam and turbo compressors.

After 16 years of working in the industry, he was appointed as a full professor of Thermal Turbomachinery at ETH Zurich in 1954. In 1956, he became the head of the Department of Mechanical Engineering and served as rector of the university from 1961 to 1965. Traupel's work in thermal turbomachinery continued during his time as a professor at ETH Zurich. During his time as rector, he emphasized the responsibility of engineers in dealing with the environment and is known for his statement: We are required to have reverence for creation as non-knowers.

Traupel became professor emeritus in 1984.

== Publications ==
- Two-volume work Thermische Turbomaschinen (Thermal Turbomachinery) considered a classic in the field of technology. The first volume is titled Thermodynamisch-strömungstechnische Berechnung (Thermodynamic-Flow Technical Calculation). It covers thermodynamic fundamentals, theory of work processes, flow theoretical fundamentals, operating procedures of thermal turbomachinery, elementary theories of the stage, the blade grid, spatial flow through turbomachinery, calculation documents, design of turbomachinery, shaft seals and thrust compensation. Springer 2001, ISBN 978-3-54067-376-7 and second volume ISBN 978-3-54067-377-4.
- List of publications.

== Honors ==
- 1970 Doctor honoris causa Technische Hochschule Aachen
- 1973 Gustaf-de-Laval-Medaille.
