= Hans-Rudolf Wenk =

Hans-Rudolf Wenk is a Swiss mountaineer, vintner, mineralogist, crystallographer and geologist.

== Education and career ==
Wenk was born in Zürich, Switzerland in 1941 and grew up in Basel. He studied crystallography at the University of Zürich under the direction of Prof. Fritz Laves and obtained a PhD in 1965. In 1966, he went to California, first on a postdoctoral position in experimental rock deformation at UCLA with David Griggs and John Christie and then, in the fall of 1967, assuming a faculty position in mineralogy at the University of California, Berkeley.

== Research ==
Wenk's research interests covered a broad field of topics. His first projects consisted of crystal structure determinations of new minerals such as the silicates wenkite (named after his father, Swiss geologist Eduard Wenk), howieite. and zussmanite, and refining crystal structures from different geological settings such as lunar ilmenite, carbonates and plagioclase. He also used transmission electron microscopy to investigate lattice defects and microstructures of plagioclase and carbonates at high resolution.

Preferred orientation of minerals in both experimentally and naturally deformed rocks remained a focus throughout his career. This involved development and application of new experimental techniques such as neutron diffraction, synchrotron X-ray diffraction and electron back-scatter diffraction. Collaboration with Fred Kocks at Los Alamos National Lab produced research projects that transformed polycrystal plasticity models to low symmetry materials and polyphase aggregates, including recrystallization.

Further studies using diamond anvil cells to reproduce pressures, stresses and temperatures representative of the deep Earth, in combination with the above-stated plasticity models, advanced the understanding of rock deformation and anisotropy in the mantle and core as observed by seismologists.

Wenk combined laboratory experiments and theoretical models with fieldwork, in his teaching and research. His focus has been on the Tertiary Bergell pluton in the Central Alps, and Southern California mylonites and pseudotachylites.

His work quantifying preferred orientation and correlating crystal alignment in shales to seismic anisotropy is used in seismic prospecting for oil and gas. Recent discoveries include extreme preferred orientation in slates, and residual strain in quartz that can be used as a paleo-piezometer of deformed rocks.

== Publications ==
Wenk co-authored works on advanced mineralogy applied to broader topics such as the texture of bones, identifying Hiroshima atomic bomb debris, and the properties of Roman concrete. His research has been reported in over 450 journal publications and 4 books

== Awards and achievements ==
Wenk's research achievements were recognized by awards, including Humboldt Fellowship, Fulbright Fellowship, Berndt Mathias Scholarship (Los Alamos National Lab), Wason Medal of the American Concrete Institute, and the Gottlob Werner Medal of the Deutsche Mineralogische Gesellschaft. His fieldwork was inspired by his passion for mountains where he climbed Mont Blanc, Piz Badile, Finsteraarhorn, Half Dome, Mt. Shasta, Kilimanjaro, Fujiyama, Kinabalu, and Pico di Orizaba.
