= Lino Guzzella =

Prof. Dr. Guzzella, Lino
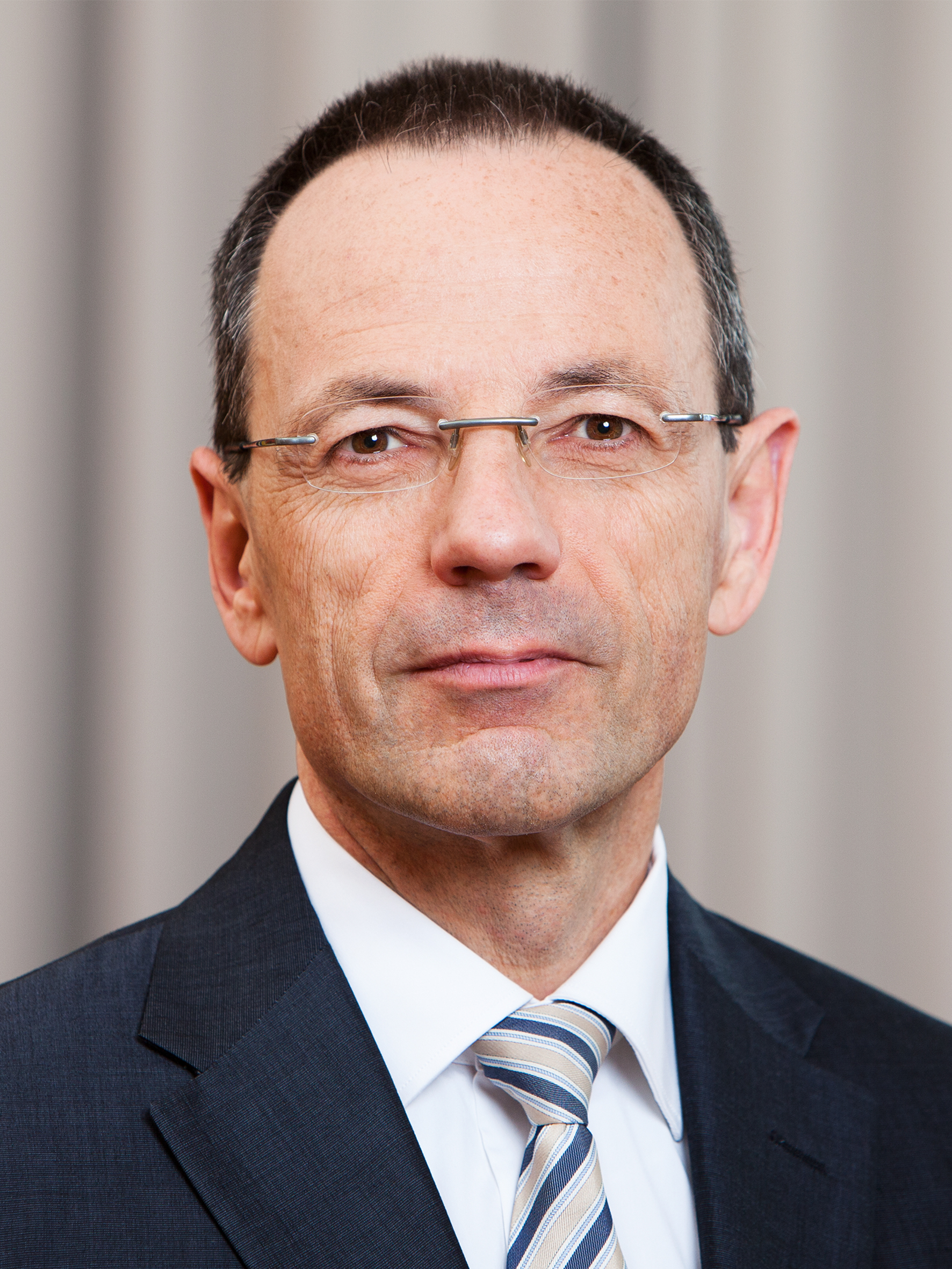
- Lino Guzzella (2013)
- Born: 13 October 1957 (age 68); Zürich
- Occupation: Professor
- Years active: 1999 - Present
- Awards: IEEE Industry Award for Excellence in Translational Control Research

Academic background
- Education: ETHZ

Academic work
- Discipline: Control Systems
- Sub-discipline: Thermotronics
- Institutions: Sulzer, Hilti

Lino Guzzella (born in 1957) is a Swiss-Italian professor at the Swiss Federal Institute of Technology in Zurich, Switzerland. He has been a full Professor of Thermotronics in the Department of Mechanical and Process Engineering at the institute for dynamic systems and control (IDSC) since 1999. In his research, Lino Guzzella works on modelling and model-assisted optimisation and control of energy technology and mechatronic systems.

Professor Guzzella's team designed the PAC-Car II, a hydrogen fuel cell vehicle that won the Energy Globe Award in November 2005. According to the team's calculations, the car used the equivalent of one litre of petrol to travel 5385 km.

His ultimate goal would be to create zero-emission cars, stating that the real challenge lies in reducing costs of hydrogen and developing its production from renewable sources.

In 2006, Prof. Guzzella appeared as a guest panellist, along with BT futurist Ian Pearson, space tourist Anousheh Ansari and renowned American astronaut Buzz Aldrin on the CNN Future Summit: World in Motion programme, presented by Richard Quest in Singapore. The programme first aired on 23 November 2006 from Singapore.

In December 2011, the ETH Zurich Professors' Conference elected Lino Guzzella as Rector to the ETH Executive Board, responsible for education, for a period of four years, starting on 1 August 2012. From January 2015 he led the ETH as its new president until the end of 2018, when Joël Mesot took over.

Prof. Guzzella authored three books. Two were published with Springer, namely, Modeling and Control of Internal Combustion Engine Systems with Christopher Onder and Vehicle Propulsion Systems with Antonio Sciarretta. The third one, Analysis and Synthesis of Single-Input/Single-Output Control Systems, was published by vdf Hochschulverlag.
