= Kenneth Hsu =

Chinese scientist and entrepreneur (born 1929)

- 许靖华
- Born: 28 June 1929 (age 97); Nanjing, China
- Education: University of California, Los Angeles
- Awards: Bownocker Medal (1984); Twenhofel Medal (1984); Wollaston Medal (1984); Penrose Medal (2001)
- Scientific career
- Fields: Geology; paleoclimatology; oceanography
- Workplaces: Shell Oil Company; ETH Zurich

Chinese name
- Traditional Chinese: 許靖華
- Simplified Chinese: 许靖华
Transcriptions
Standard Mandarin
- Hanyu Pinyin: Xǔ Jìnghuá

Kenneth Jinghwa Hsu (simplified Chinese: 许靖华; traditional Chinese: 許靖華; pinyin: Xǔ Jìnghuá, born 28 June 1929) is a Chinese paleoclimatologist, oceanographer, and entrepreneur who was born in Nanjing, China.

== Biography ==
Education

Hsu (Prof. Dr. Dr. h.c.) studied at National Central University (later renamed Nanjing University) (B.Sc. 1948), and came to the United States in 1948 where he studied at Ohio State University (M.A., 1950), and at University of California, Los Angeles, where he received his Ph.D. in 1953.

Professional life

Hsu initially worked as a petroleum geologist for the Shell Development Corporation, now called Shell Oil Company, in Houston, Texas, between 1954 and 1963. He was associate professor at two universities in the USA between 1963 and 1967, before becoming professor of geology at the Swiss Federal Institute of Technology (ETH Zürich) between 1967 and 1994, where he promoted experimental geology and built up 5 leading international laboratories in the fields of rock mechanics (geophysics), mass-spectrometry (isotope geochemistry), Quaternary research (paleoclimatology), sedimentology and tectonics. It was after his retirement from University teaching that Hsu started to work in environmental engineering.

Professorships & lectureships

While Hsu was professor at the Institute of Geology, ETH Zurich between 1967 and 1994, he was invited as lecturer, guest or honorary professor in geology, climatology or oceanography to numerous renowned universities of the world.

After retirement in 1994, he was guest professor at the National Taiwan University (1994–95), senior fellow at the Berlin Institute of Advanced Studies (1995–96), Keck Professor at Colorado School of Mines, guest professor at the Hebrew University of Jerusalem, university professor at Nanjing University, and university professor at Beijing University of Geosciences.

== Scientific contributions ==
Academic work

Hsu participated in the Earth Science Revolution of the 1960s, consolidating Plate Tectonics Theory, and has throughout his life been active in so-called 'Process Oriented Geology', which is in conversation with the evolutionary biology (symbiogenesis) of Lynn Margulis, the Gaia hypothesis of James Lovelock, and others. Instead of being preoccupied with rocks and mirrors, Hsu treated geological problems as arising from physical, chemical and biological processes, and hence has been a stout promoter of an educational reform in geology, emphasizing the fundamental principles of earth physics, chemistry and biology.

In geology, his work included sedimentation in isostatically driven tectonic basins, the active margins of continental plates, physical chemistry of evaporite and pelagic diagenesis, documentation of granulite formation, catastrophic consequences of meteorite impacts, extinction of life forms and the limnology of Lake Zurich.

Scientific expeditions and explorations

Hsu participated and led 5 deep-sea drilling cruises to the South Atlantic, Mediterranean, and Black Sea. He also led several international expeditions to Tibet, Xinjiang, Inner Mongolia, South China, California Coast Ranges and the Swiss Alps, travelling to 80 countries for Earth Science.

Awards

For his contributions to geology, Hsu received several medals and awards.

- Wollaston Medal from The Geological Society of London (considered the highest honor in Geology, or an equivalent to the Nobel Prize in Geology) in 1984 (formerly presented to Charles Lyell, Thomas Henry Huxley, Charles Darwin and James Lovelock).
- Penrose Medal from The Geological Society of America in 2001 (the highest honor by the Society).
- President's Special Award, American Association of Petroleum Geologists (resulting in Hsu being listed in Who's Who in Trade & Industry)
- Twenhofel Medal from the Society of Sedimentary Geology in 1984 (the highest award of the Society of Sedimentary Geology).
- Bownocker Medal (Orton Award), from the Geological Sciences Department of Ohio State University, 1984.

Honorary positions and achievements

Hsu was elected a Member of the U. S. National Academy of Science in 1986, but in given circumstances, became a Foreign Associate. He was also an Associate of the Third-World Academy of Sciences, a Member of Academia Sinica (1988), the Mediterranean Academy of Sciences and several other academies of science. He was a founder of the European Geophysical Society and a founder of the science of paleoceanography. He convened the First International Conference of Paleoceanography and founded the journal Paleoceanography. Hsu also assisted in the founding of the Asian Association of Marine Geology. He also served for 11 years as President of the International Association of Sedimentologists. Hsu was the convener of the Third Workshop on Marine Geology of IUGS; the First Earth Science Colloquium of the European Science Foundation; several Dahlem Conferences of the Dahlem Foundation; and numerous symposia and workshops for IGP, ILP, IGCP, SCOR and JOIDE.

== See also ==
- List of ETH Zurich people
