= Bruno Sander =

Austrian geologist (1884–1979)

Hermann Max Bruno Sander (23 February 1884, Innsbruck – 5 September 1979, Innsbruck) was an Austrian geologist. He is known, along with Walter Schmidt (1885–1945), for founding petrofabric analysis (sometimes called structural petrology).

== Biography ==
Bruno Sander, whose father was a public prosecutor, spent his boyhood in what was then Bozen in the Austro-Hungarian Empire. After graduating from secondary school and successfully completing in 1902 his Matura in Innsbruck, he studied zoology, mineralogy, botany, physics, and mathematics at the University of Innsbruck. There he received in 1907 his doctorate in geology with a study on granites in the region near Brixen in the Sarntal Alps. His doctoral dissertation, supervised by Josef Blaas (1851–1936), is entitled Geologische Beschreibung des Brixner Granits. Sander worked as an academic assistant from 1907 to 1909 at TH Wien and from 1909 to 1913 at the University of Innsbruck, where he completed his habilitation in 1912.

Beginning in 1913 he was employed at Vienna's Geologischen Reichsanstalt, where he worked on geological mapping of South Tyrol. His employment was interrupted by WW I. During his military service, he was a commissioned officer with the title Lagerstättenebegutacher (mineral deposit surveyor) under the command of K.u.K. Kriegsministerium. Part of his duty was in 1917–1918 investigating bituminous marl in the mountains of Bulgaria and Turkey. From the end of WW I until 1919 he was in a prisoner-of-war camp in Turkey. After the dissolution of the Austro-Hungarian Empire, he returned to his prewar employment in Vienna, where the Geologischen Reichsanstalt was renamed the Geologischen Staatsanstalt. He worked there from 1920 to 1922.

In 1921 Sander was a candidate in the competition for the geology professorship at the University of Innsbruck, but that competition was won by Raimund von Klebelsberg (1886–1967). On the 1st of October 1922, Sander was appointed to the University of Innsbruck's professorial chair of mineralogy and petrography — overcoming the strong resistance against Sander's appointment from the “Vienna School” around Friedrich Johann Karl Becke. He was a professor of mineralogy and petrography at the University of Innsbruck from 1922 to 1955, when he retired as professor emeritus.

Sander became known as the founder of an internationally renowned "Innsbruck school of mineralogy and geology" with branches worldwide. Sander's 1-volume (1930) Gefügekunde der Gesteine (Structural Science of Rocks) and his 2-volume (1948 & 1950) Einführung in die Gefügekunde geologischer Körper (Introduction to the Structural Science of Geological Bodies) both became international standard works. He is considered a pioneer of geological-mineralogical structural science with applications in rock mechanics and engineering geology. According to Eleanora Bliss Knopf, Sander's 1911 paper Über Zusammenhänge zwischen Teilbewegung und Gefüge in Gesteinen is a "milestone in petrology". A central idea in Sander's research is that the symmetries of geological bodies, both macroscopic and microscopic, reflect various symmetries of the depositing media that created the deposit in which the geological bodies are located.

In addition to his work as a geologist, he was also a writer who published under the pseudonym Anton Santer. He belonged to the Brenner group before WW I and from 1919 to 1926 regularly published poems in their magazine Der Brenner. He also published as Anton Santer in the magazines Wort im Gebirge and Seefelder Zeitung.

Sander was awarded in 1950 the Gustav Steinmann Medal, in 1957 the Penrose Medal, and in 1964 the German Mineralogical Society's Abraham Gottlob Werner Medal. In 1956, he received an International Feltrinelli Prize, the Austrian Mineralogical Society's Friedrich Becke Medal, and the Belgian Geological Society's André Dumont Medal. In 1958 the Austrian Geological Society appointed him an honorary member and awarded him the Eduard Sueß Medal.

He received honorary doctorates from the University of Göttingen (1937) and the University of Vienna (1959). He was elected in 1936 a member of the Leopoldina and in 1966 a member of the United States National Academy of Sciences. He was a member of the Austrian Academy of Sciences (corresponding member since 1940 and full member since 1944), as well as the academies of sciences in Bologna (1942), Uppsala (1947), and Berlin (1950). He received in 1955 the Ring of Honor of the city of Innsbruck, in 1959 the Austrian Decoration of Honor for Science and Art, and in 1967 the Decoration of Honor of the State of Tyrol.

Waldemar Berdesinski named the mineral sanderite after him in 1952. The building of the Faculty of Earth and Atmospheric Sciences at the University of Innsbruck was named after Bruno Sander. He is also the namesake of the Sander Pass in Antarctica.

In 1920 he married Elisabeth Holzknecht (1897–1997). They had one daughter.

The University of Innsbruck stores his fonds in the Brenner archive.

== Selected publications ==
- Zur Geologie der Zentralalpen (On the geology of the Central Alps), Verhandlungen der Kaiserliche-Königlichen Geologischen Reichanstalt. 1916, Nr. 9 & Nr. 10.
- Gefügekunde der Gesteine mit besonderer Berücksichtigung der Tektonite (Structural science of rocks with special consideration of tectonites), Wien, Springer Verlag 1930. LCCN 31-2694
  - Sander, Bruno (8 March 2013). 2013 pbk reprint of 1930 1st edition. Springer. ISBN 9783709198094.
- Einführung in die Gefügekunde geologischer Körper (Introduction to the structural science of geological bodies), 2 volumes, Springer Verlag 1948 & 1950. LCCN 50-21606
  - An introduction to the study of fabrics of geological bodies, Pergamon Press 1970; translation by Frank Coles Phillips and George Windsor LCCN 71-94940
  - Sander, Bruno (22 October 2013). 2013 pbk reprint of 1970 1st edition. Elsevier. ISBN 9781483153940.
- Beiträge zur Kenntnis des Ablagerungsgefüges (Contributions to the knowledge of the accretion structure), Tschermaks Mineralogische und Petrographische Mitteilungen, volume 48, 1936, pp. 27–209.
- Petrofabrics and Orogenesis, American Journal of Science, series 5, volume 28, 1934, pp. 37–50.
