= Burelle =

French holding company

Burelle SA
- Burelle logo
- Type: Société anonyme
- Traded as: Euronext Paris: BUR; CAC All-Share
- Industry: Holding company
- Founded: 1957
- Headquarters: Lyon, France
- Key people: Laurent Burelle (Chairman and CEO)
- Products: Automotive components, Real estate, Private equity
- Services: Asset management, Investments
- Revenue: €11.6 billion (2024 economic), €10.5 billion (2024 consolidated)
- Operating income: €446 million (2024 consolidated)
- Net income: €182 million (2024 consolidated)
- Total assets: €8.185 billion (2024)
- Total equity: €2.477 billion (2024)
- Owner: Burelle family (85% capital, 92% voting rights)
- Number of employees: 38,900 (2024)
- Subsidiaries: OPmobility SE, Sofiparc SAS, Burelle Participations SA
- Website: burelle.fr

Burelle SA is a French holding company headquartered in Lyon, France. It primarily operates through its subsidiaries OPmobility SE, Sofiparc, and Burelle Participations. Burelle SA is listed on Euronext Paris (Compartment B, ISIN: FR0000061137).

== History ==
Burelle was founded on February 27, 1957, by Pierre Burelle as a holding structure for the family’s growing business activities. It went public in 1987 and is currently controlled by the Burelle family.

== Subsidiaries ==
=== OPmobility SE (formerly Plastic Omnium) ===
OPmobility SE designs and manufactures advanced mobility solutions, including exterior systems, lighting systems, complex modules, energy storage systems, and battery and hydrogen electrification solutions. In 2024, OPmobility achieved economic revenues of €11.6 billion, with a 4.2% operating margin amounting to €446 million in operating income and €170 million in net income. The company employed around 38,900 people globally as of 2024 and is majority-owned by Burelle SA with a 60.63% stake.

=== Sofiparc ===
Sofiparc specializes in real estate management, operating a portfolio of over 70,410 square meters of office space and 1,223 parking spots primarily in Paris and Lyon. It manages hotel assets and expanded internationally into Belgium in 2024. Sofiparc recorded a net profit of €11 million in 2024.

=== Burelle Participations ===
Burelle Participations, fully owned by Burelle SA, is a private equity investor focused on medium-sized companies outside the automotive sector. Its net asset value grew 11% in 2024, reaching €144 million, with new investment commitments totaling €39.1 million during the year.

== Ownership structure ==
As of the end of 2024, the Burelle family held approximately 85% of Burelle SA's capital and 92% of the voting rights through direct and indirect holdings, including Sogec 2 and Compagnie Financière de la Cascade.

== Financial Performance ==
In 2024, Burelle SA reported consolidated net income of €182 million, with net income attributable to the group of €115 million. The company's net asset value per share stood at €746 at year-end, and consolidated net debt was €1.495 billion, representing a net debt-to-equity ratio of 60.4%.
