= 1696 in science =

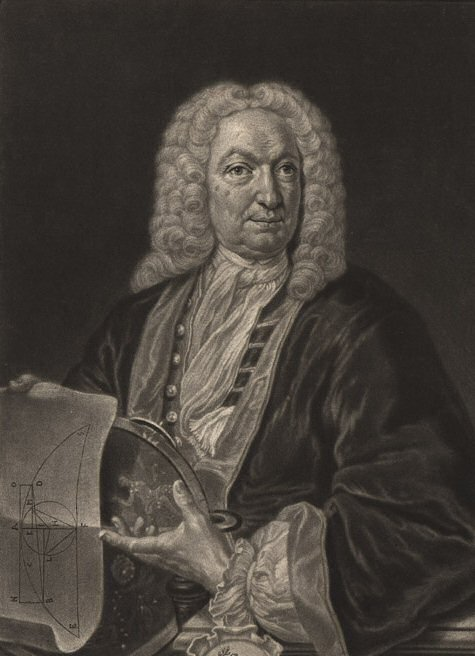
Johann Bernoulli

The year 1696 in science and technology involved some significant events.

== History of science ==
- Daniel Le Clerc publishes Histoire de la médecine in Geneva, the first comprehensive work on the subject.

== Mathematics ==
- Guillaume de l'Hôpital publishes Analyse des Infiniment Petits pour l'Intelligence des Lignes Courbes, the first textbook on differential calculus, including a statement of his rule for the computation of certain limits.
- Jakob Bernoulli and Johann Bernoulli solve the brachistochrone curve problem, the first result in the calculus of variations.

== Births ==
- unknown date – Christine Kirch, German astronomer (d. 1782)

== Deaths ==
- April 30 – Robert Plot, English naturalist and chemist (born 1640)
- Jean Richer, French astronomer (born 1630)
