= Edmund Stone =

Scottish mathematician and translator (c. 1690–1768)

Edmund Stone FRS
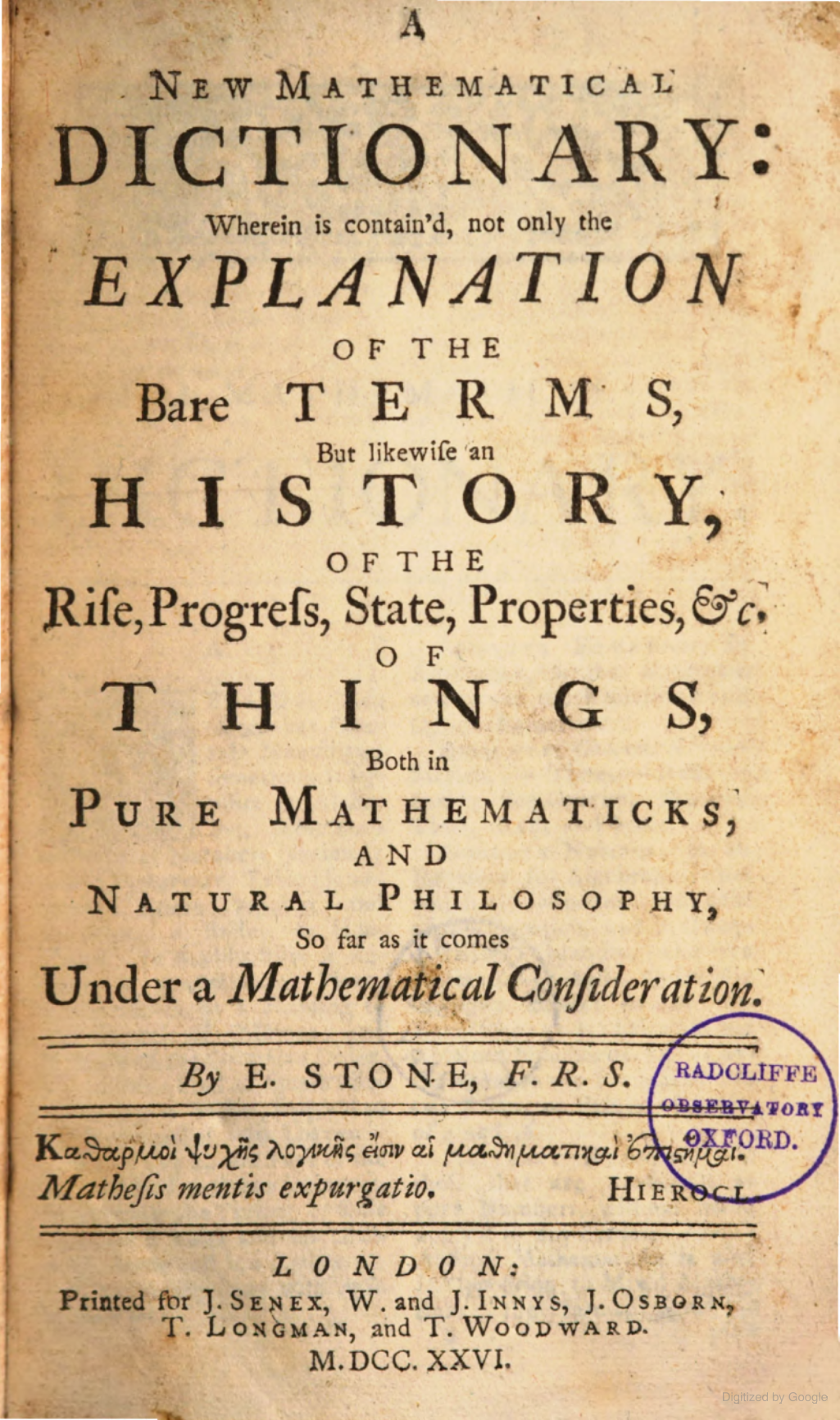
- A New Mathematical Dictionary (1726)
- Born: c. 1690 unknown, likely Argyllshire, Scotland
- Died: March or April 1768 unknown
- Scientific career
- Fields: Mathematics
- Patrons: John Campbell, 2nd Duke of Argyll

Edmund Stone (c. 1690 – March or April 1768) was an autodidact Scottish mathematician who lived in London and primarily worked as an editor of mathematical and scientific texts and translator from French and Latin into English. He is especially known for his translations of Nicholas Bion's Mathematical Instruments (1723, 1758) and the Marquis de l'Hospital's Analyse des Infiniment Petits (1730), and for his New Mathematical Dictionary (1726, 1743). Stone was celebrated for having risen from uneducated gardener's son to accomplished scholar.

== Biography ==
The date and place of Edmund Stone's birth are unknown, as are the names of his parents, but he was probably born in Argyllshire, Scotland, at least a few years before 1700. What little is known about his early life comes from a letter by Andrew Michael Ramsay to Louis-Bertrand Castel, excerpted by the Journal de Trévoux. (See § Appendix: Letter from Ramsay below for the letter and a translation.) According to this letter, Stone was the son of the gardener of John Campbell, 2nd Duke of Argyll. He never attended any formal school, but after being taught by a servant to read at age 18, he taught himself arithmetic, geometry, Latin, and French. As the story goes, the Duke found a copy of Isaac Newton's Principia in the grass in his garden, and was astonished to find it belonged to the 28-year-old Stone, and that he understood Latin and advanced mathematics. However, Stone's description of himself having studied mathematical instruments from the age of twelve seems inconsistent with this story. The Duke became his patron.

With the Duke's support, Stone moved to London c. 1720, where he likely worked as a mathematics tutor. (Note: In the advertisement to the supplement to the 2nd edition of Mathematical Instruments (1758, p. Y y y 2), Stone claimed he had originally translated the book in the 1720s "with Reluctance, and at the Desire of Friends"; at the time, friends was a common euphemism for pupils. See Taylor 1966, pp. 26–27; Blanco 2015.) He published translations of the Marquis de l'Hospital's posthumous book about conic sections in 1720 and Christopher Clavius's translation of Theodosius's Spherics in 1721. In 1723 he published a translation of Nicholas Bion's Construction and Principal Uses of Mathematical Instruments, to which he added descriptions of the English variants of the French instruments described by Bion; this book became the standard reference about the subject in English throughout the 18th century. In 1725 he was elected a Fellow of the Royal Society, and from 1725 until at least 1736 he was a member of the Board of Green Cloth. His New Mathematical Dictionary appeared in 1726, a cheaper alternative to John Harris's Lexicon Technicum. He also translated Euclid's Elements (1728); l'Hospital's differential calculus book Analyse des Infiniment Petits, to which he adjoined a second part about integral calculus, as The Method of Fluxions (1730); and Isaac Barrow's Geometrical Lectures (1735).

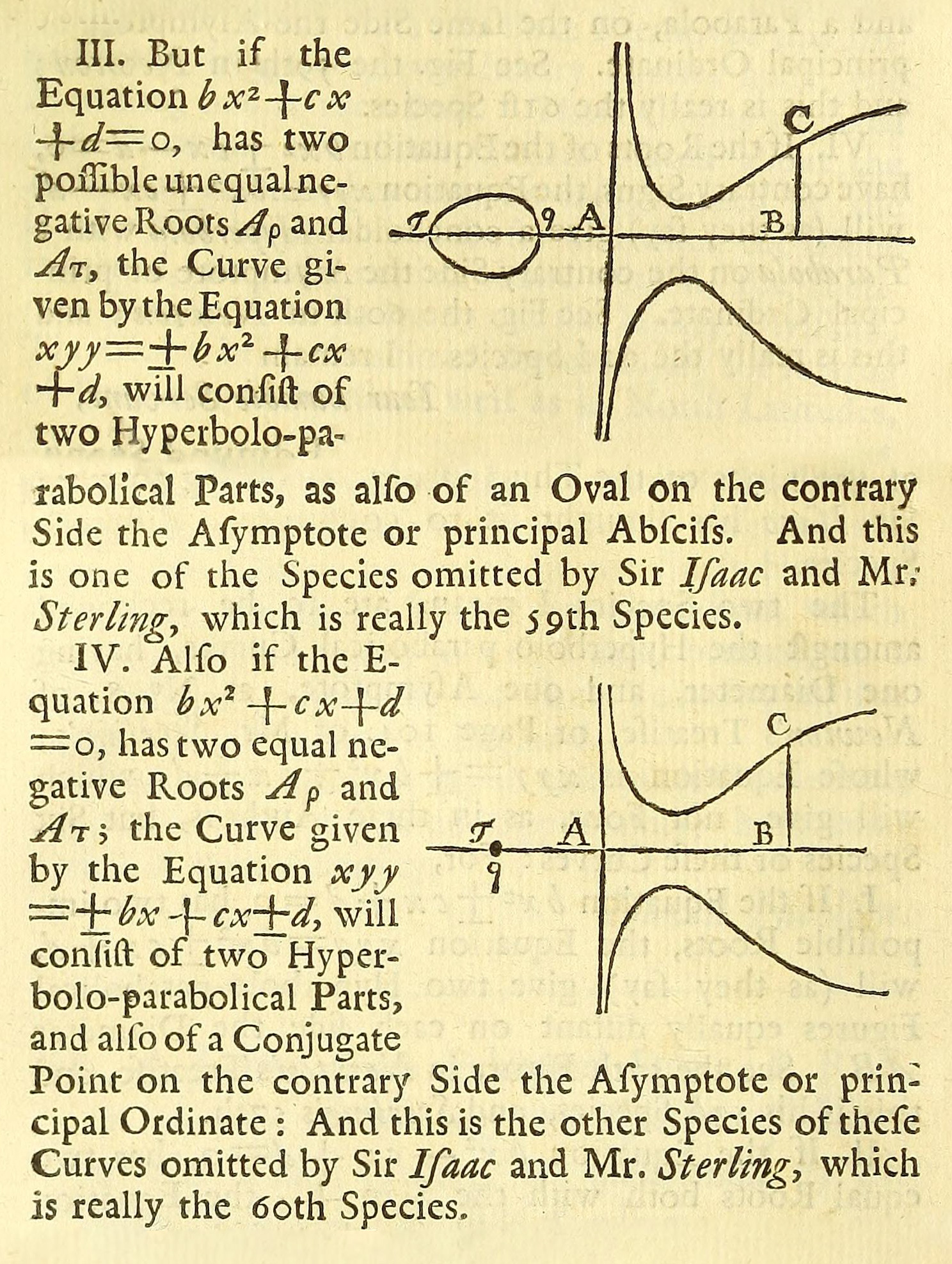
Two cubic curves published by Stone in 1740

In 1736 Stone submitted a paper to the Philosophical Transactions of the Royal Society (published 1740) about two cubic plane curves not cataloged by Isaac Newton or James Stirling, but unbeknownst to him the two had been previously published in 1731 by François Nicole and 1733 by Nicolaus Bernoulli, respectively. In 1742 Stone submitted a 21-page paper "On Sir Isaac Newton's five diverging Parabolas", which was read to the Society but apparently never published.

In 1742, Stone resigned as a Fellow of the Royal Society, perhaps for inability to pay the small annual membership fee. In October 1743 Stone's patron the Duke of Argyll died. Little is known about Stone's life afterward, though he made another translation of Euclid's Elements in 1752, and he published a second edition of Bion's Mathematical Instruments in 1758, with a long appendix covering advancements of the intervening years. In a 1760 review in The Critical Review, Tobias Smollett wrote of Stone's situation, "His abilities are universally acknowledged, his reputation unblemished, his services to the public uncontested, and yet he lives to an advanced age unrewarded, except by a mean employment that reflects dishonour on the donor". In 1766 Stone published a contrarian polemic contesting the scientific validity of the spherical shape of the Earth and suggesting contemporary evidence was insufficient to discount the possibility Earth is an irregular roundish polyhedron; biographers have suggested this book was the product of cognitive decline. Stone died in March or April 1768.

== Works ==
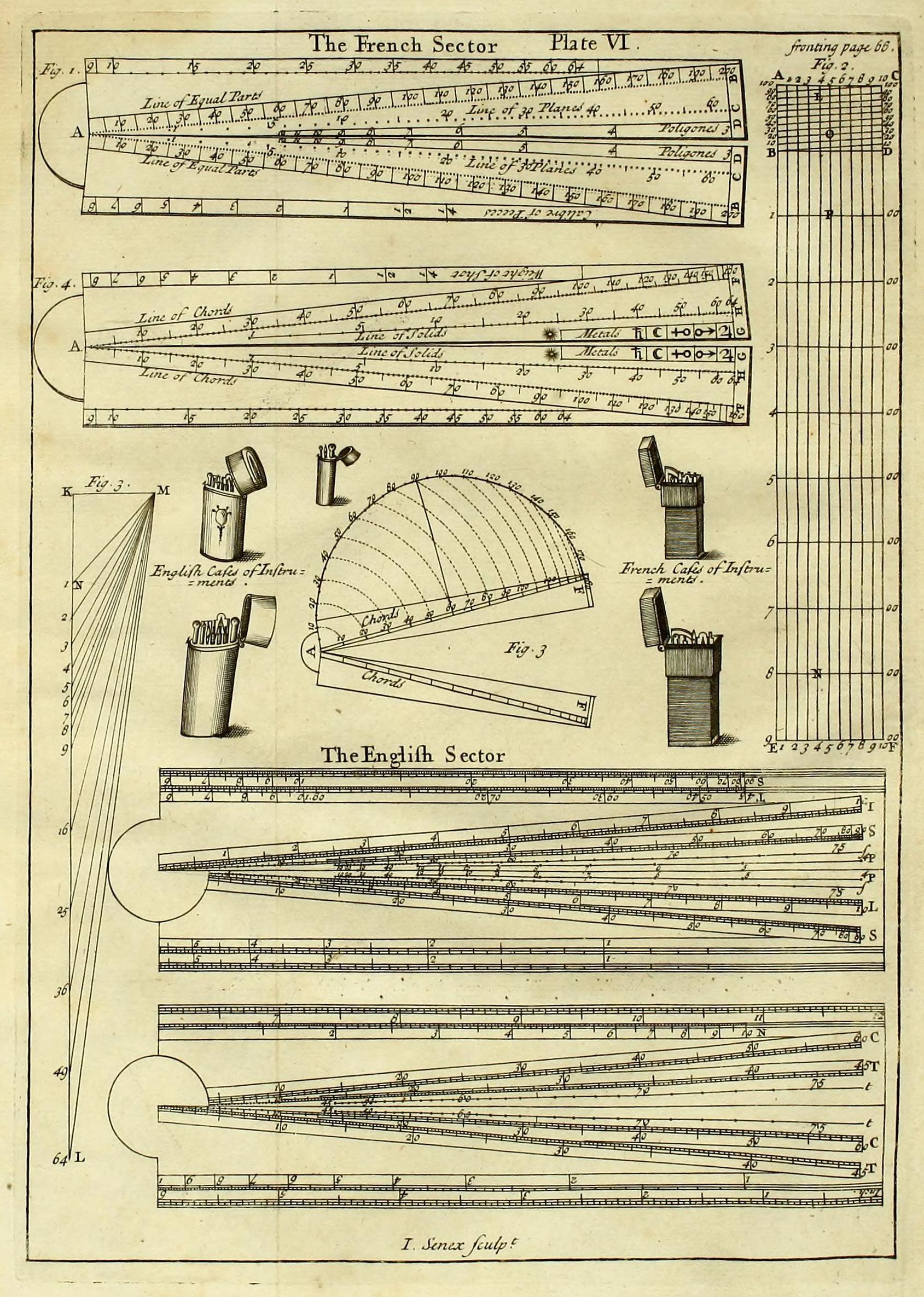
The English sector vs. the French compas de proportion, from Mathematical Instruments (1723); engraving by John Senex

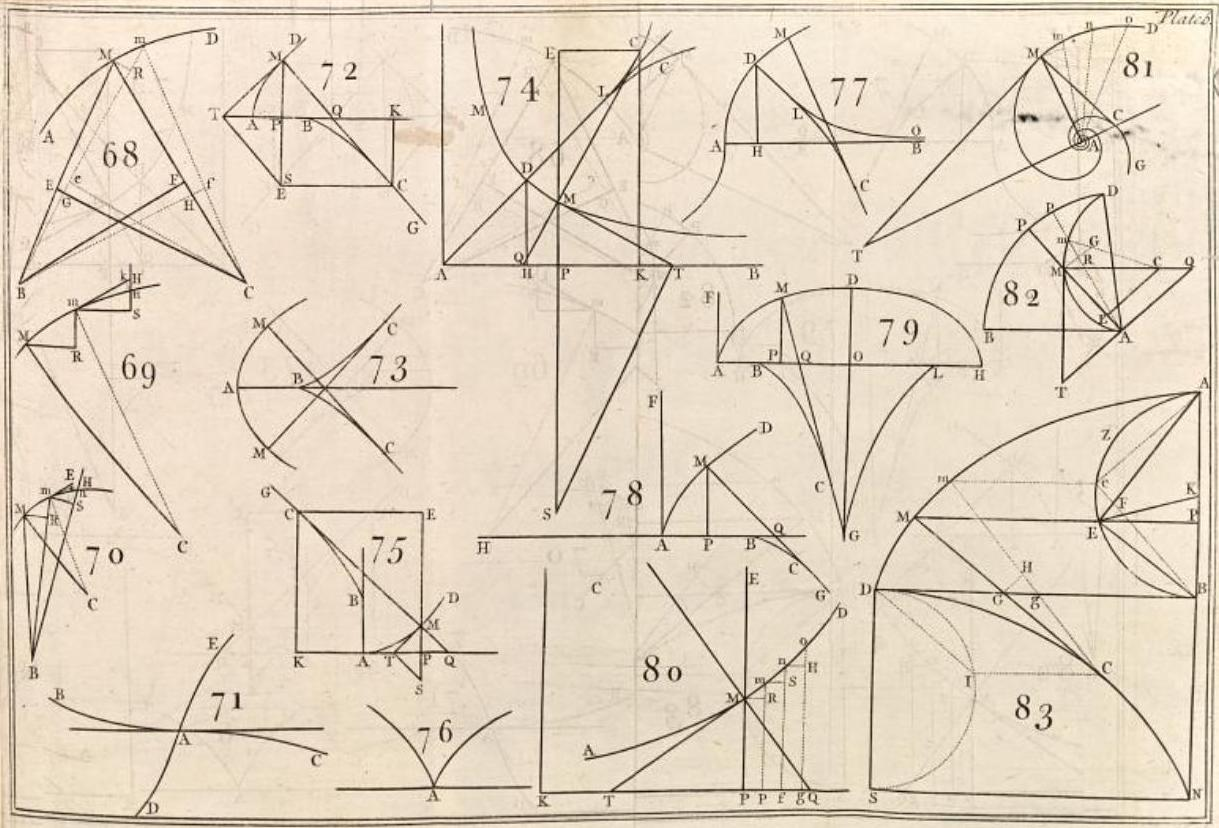
A plate of figures from The Method of Fluxions (1730)

- 1720, An Analytick Treatise of Conick Sections, a translation of the Marquis de l'Hospital's posthumous Traité analytique des sections coniques (1707).
- 1721, The Description, Nature and General Use, of the Sector and Plain-scale. Anonymous, but the preface is signed E.S., and it was later credited to Stone. 2nd edition 1728. 4th edition 1746.
- 1721, Clavius's Commentary on the Sphericks of Theodosius Tripolitae: or, Spherical Elements, translated from Christopher Clavius's Theodosii Tripolitae Sphaericorum Libri III (1586), a Latin translation of Theodosius of Bithynia's Spherics.
- 1723, The Construction and Principal Uses of Mathematical Instruments, a translation of Nicolas Bion's Traité de la construction et des principaux usages des instrumens de mathématique (Revised ed. 1723) [1st ed. 1709], expanded with a description of English variants of the French instruments described by Bion, illustrated by the publisher John Senex's handsome engravings. Stone published a 2nd edition in 1758, including "A Supplement: Containing a further Account of some of the most useful Mathematical Instruments as now improved." (pp. 265–325).
- 1723, Mathesis Enucleata: or, The Elements of the Mathematicks. 2nd ed. of a translation of Johann Sturm's Mathesis Enucleata (2nd ed. 1695). The 1st English ed. (1700) was translated by J. R. A. M. & R. S. S.
- 1724, An Essay on Perspective translated from Willem 's Gravesande's Essai de perspective (1711).
- 1726, A New Mathematical Dictionary. 2nd ed. 1743. This dictionary was at least partly compiled from uncredited previous sources such as Joseph Moxon's Mathematicks made Easie (3rd ed. 1701, revised by James Moxon & Thomas Tuttle).
- 1728, The Elements of Physical and Geometrical Astronomy, 2nd English ed., translated from David Gregory's Astronomiæ Physicæ & Geometricæ Elementa (2nd ed. 1726, Vol. 1 & Vol 2). The 1st English ed. (1715) was translated by Gregory from his 1st Latin ed. (1702).
- 1728, Euclid's Elements of Geometry, Briefly, yet Plainly Demonstrated, a translation of Isaac Barrow's Euclidis Elementorum libri XV breviter demonstrati (1659), a Latin translation of Euclid's Elements.
- 1729, A New Treatise of the Construction and Use of the Sector, a posthumous work by Samuel Cunn revised by Stone for publication.
- 1730, The Method of Fluxions, both Direct and Inverse, the first part translated from l'Hospital's differential calculus book Analyse des infiniment petits (2nd ed., 1715) [1st ed. 1696], and the second part on integral calculus written by Stone. Stone's part was translated into French by Rondet as Analise des infiniment petits, comprenant le calcul integral dans toute son étenduë (1735).
- 1731, Euclid's Elements, Vol. II. Containing the seventh, eighth, ninth, tenth, thirteenth, and fifteenth Books, with the Data. Translated from David Gregory's Euclidis quæ supersunt omnia (1703). Published by Thomas Woodward as a sequel to John Keill's Euclid's Elements of Geometry (Revised ed. 1723), translated from Federico Commandino's Latin edition, containing books 1–6 and 11–12.
- 1735, Geometrical Lectures, translated from Isaac Barrow's Lectiones Opticae et Geometricae (1674).
- 1743, The Theory of the Working of Ships, Applied to Practice, translation of Henri Pitot's Théorie de la manoeuvre des vaisseaux réduite en pratique (1731).
- 1752, Euclid's Elements of Geometry, The First Six, the Eleventh and Twelfth Books, a translation of the parts of Elements in Gregory's Euclid not previously translated by Stone in 1731. 2nd edition 1765.
- 1766, Some Reflections on the Uncertainty of Many Astronomical and Geographical Positions

== Appendix: Letter from Ramsay ==
A letter from Andrew Michael Ramsay to Louis-Bertrand Castel was excerpted by the Journal de Trévoux 1732, pp. 109–112, as part of a review of Stone's The Method of Fluxions (1730). Here is the excerpt reproduced, along with an English translation:

Lettre de M. le C. D. R. au P. C. J.

Le véritable génie surmonte tous les désavantages de la fortune, de la naissance, de l'education. M. Stone en est un rare exemple: né fils du Jardinier du Duc d'Argyle, il parvint à l'âge de 18. ans, sans sçavoir lire; son pére ne sçavoit pas lui apprendre son métier de cette maniére élevée, qui rend le jardinage & l'agriculture une partie très-utile & très-noble de la Cosmographie & de la Physique.

Par hazard, un domestique ayant appris au jeune Stone les Lettres de l'Alphabet, il n'en falut pas d'avantage pour faire éclore son génie & pour le déveloper. Il s'appliqua lui-même, il étudia, il parvint aux connoissances de la plus sublime géométrie, & du calcul, sans maître, sans conducteur, sans autre guide que le pur génie.

A l'âge de 28. ans il avoit fait tous ces progrès sans être connu, & sans connoître lui-même les prodiges qui se passoient en lui.

Mylord Duc d'Argyle, qui joint à toutes les vertus militaires & à tous les sentimens d'un Héros, une connoissance universelle de tout ce qui peut orner & perfectioner l'esprit d'un homme de son rang, se promenant un jour dans son jardin, vit fur l'herbe le fameux Livre du Chevalier Newton en Latin. Il appella quelqu'un pour le ramasser & le reporter dans la Bibliothéque.

Le jeune Jardinier lui dit que ce Livre lui appartenoit. A vous, répondit le Mylord? Entendés-vous la Géometrie, le Latin, M. Newton? J'entends un peu de tout cela, repliqua Stone avec un air de simplicité fondé sur l'ignorance profonde de ses propres talens, & de l'excès de son sçavoir.

Mylord Duc fut très surpris: mais comme il a le goût de ces sciences, il daigna entrer en conversation avec le nouveau Géométre: il lui fit plusieurs questions, & demeura étonné de la force, de la justesse, & de la candeur de ses réponses.

„Mais comment, dit le Mylord, es-tu parvenu à toutes ces connoissances? L'autre répond: un domestique m'apprit, il y a dix ans, à lire: a-t'on besoin de sçavoir autre chose que les 24. lettres pour apprendre tout ce qu'on veut„? La curiosité du Duc redouble; il soupçonne que les démarches de ce génie marveilleux étoient encore plus surprenantes que ses progrès; il s'affeoit sur un banc, & lui demande le detail de tout ce qu'il a fait pour devenir habile.

„J'appris d'abord à lire, dit Stone, les massons travailloient alors à vôtre maison: je m'approchai d'eux un jour, & je vis que l'Architecte usoit d'une régle, d'un compas, & qu'il calculoit. Je demandai ce qu'il faisoit là, & à quoi tout cela étoit bon; & je compris qu'il y avoit une science qu'on appelloit Arithmétique. J'achetai un Livre d'Arithmetique, & je l'appris.

„On m'avoit dit qu'il y en avoit une autre appellée Géométrie: j'achetai des Livres, & j'appris la Géometrie. Je vis à force de lire qu'il y avoit de beaux Livres sur ces deux sciences en Latin: j'achetai un Dictionaire, & j'appris le Latin. J'appris aussi qu'il y avoit de beaux Livres de même espéce en François: j'achetai un Dictionaire, & j'appris le François. Voila, Monseigneur, tout ce que j'ai fait, il me semble qu'on peut tout apprendre quand on sçait les 24. lettres de l'Alphabet„.

Ce récit charma Mylord Duc. Il tira ce génie merveilleux de l'obscurité; & il le pourvut d'un emploi que lui laisse tout le tems de s'appliquer aux sciences. Il découvrit en lui le même génie pour la musique, pour la peinture, pour l'architecture, pour toutes les sciences que dépandent du calcul & des proportions.

J'ai vû le Sr. Stone. C'est un homme d'une simplicité admirable. Il sçait à présent qu'il sçait: mais il n'en est pas enflé. Il est possédé d'un amour pur & desintéressé pour la Géométrie. Il ne se soucie pas de passer pour Géométre. Le bel esprit & la vanité n'ont aucune part aux travaux infinis, qu'il subit pour exceller dans ce genre. Il méprise aussi la fortune, & m'a sollicité vingt fois de prier Milord de lui donner un moindre emploi, qui ne valoit que la moitié de celui qu'il a, afin d'être plus solitaire, & moins distraît de ses études favorites. Il découvre quelquesfois, par des méthodes qui lui sont propres, les mêmes vérités que d'autres on déja trouvées. Il est charmé de voir qu'il n'en est pas l'inventeur, & que les hommes ont fait plus de progrès qu'il ne croyoit. Loin d'être plagiare, il attribuë les solutions ingénieuses & admirables, qu'il donne de certains Problémes, aux indices qu'il en trouve dans les autres, quoiqu'elles n'en découlent que par des conséquences fort éloignées, &c.

Letter from Mr. the [Chevalier de Ramsay] to the [Father Castel Jesuit]

True genius overcomes all the disadvantages of fortune, of birth, of education. Mr. Stone is a rare example: born son of the gardener to the Duke of Argyle, he reached the age of 18 years without knowing how to read; his father did not know how to teach him his trade in that elevated way, which makes gardening and agriculture a very useful and very noble part of cosmography and physics.

By chance, a servant having taught the young Stone the letters of the alphabet, it took nothing further to hatch his genius and to develop it. He applied himself, he studied, he arrived at the knowledge of the most sublime geometry, and of calculation, without master, without conductor, with no other guide than pure genius.

At the age of 28 years he had made all this progress without being known, and without knowing himself the wonders that happened in him.

Milord Duke of Argyle, who joins to all the military virtues and all the feelings of a hero, a universal knowledge of all that can adorn and perfect the mind of a man of his rank, while walking one day in his garden saw on the grass the famous book of Sir Isaac Newton in Latin. He called someone to pick it up and return it to the library.

The young gardener told him that this book belonged to him. "To you?" replied the Duke. "Do you understand geometry, Latin, Mr. Newton?" "I understand a bit of all that", replied Stone with an air of simplicity based on profound ignorance of his own talents and the excess of his knowledge.

Milord Duke was very surprised: but as he has the taste for these sciences, he deigned to enter into conversation with the new geometer: he posed several questions to him, and remained astonished at the force, the accuracy, and the candor of his responses.

"But how", said the Duke, "have you come to all this knowledge?" The other replied, "a servant taught me, ten years ago, to read: does one need to know anything other than the 24 letters to learn everything one wants?" The Duke's curiosity redoubled; he suspected that the process of this marvelous genius would be even more surprising than his progress; he sat down on a bench, and asked him to detail all he had done to become skillful.

"I first learned to read", said Stone, "the masons were then working at your house: I approached them one day, and I saw that the architect was using a ruler, a compass, and that he calculated. I asked what he was doing there, and what it was all good for; and I comprehended that there was a science called arithmetic. I bought an arithmetic book, and I learned it.

"I was told there was another called geometry: I bought books, and I learned geometry. I perceived by way of reading that there were fine books on these two sciences in Latin: I bought a dictionary, and I learned Latin. I also learned that there were fine books of the same kind in French: I bought a dictionary, and I learned French. So you see, Sir, everything I have done, it seems to me that anyone can learn it all when one knows the 24 letters of the alphabet."

This story charmed milord Duke. He drew this marvelous genius from obscurity; and he provided him with a job that left him all the time to apply himself to the sciences. He discovered in him the same genius for music, for painting, for architecture, for all the sciences that depend on calculation and proportions.

I have seen Mr. Stone. He is a man of admirable simplicity. He now recognizes his own knowledge: but he is not inflated. He is possessed of a pure and disinterested love for geometry. He does not worry about passing for a geometer. Wit and vanity have no part in the infinite labors he undergoes to excel in this subject. He also despises fortune, and has asked me twenty times to entreat milord to give him a lesser job, worth only half the one he has, in order to have more time alone, less distracted from his favorite studies. He sometimes discovers, by his own methods, the same truths that others have already found. He is charmed to see that he is not their inventor, and that men have made more progress than he had supposed. Far from being a plagiarist, he attributes the ingenious and admirable solutions he gives of certain problems to the hints he finds of them in others, even though they only follow by a very circuitous chain of causes, &c.
