= Baigneaux =

Baigneaux is the name of several communes in France:

- Baigneaux, Eure-et-Loir, in the Eure-et-Loir department
- Baigneaux, Gironde in the Gironde department
- Baigneaux, Loir-et-Cher in the Loir-et-Cher department
