= Beauvilliers =

Beauvilliers may refer to:

- Beauvilliers (surname), a French surname, also of French nobility
- Communes in France:
  - Beauvilliers, Eure-et-Loir, in the Eure-et-Loir department
  - Beauvilliers, Loir-et-Cher, in the Loir-et-Cher department
  - Beauvilliers, Yonne, in the Yonne department
