= The Construction and Principal Uses of Mathematical Instruments =

Book by Nicolas Bion

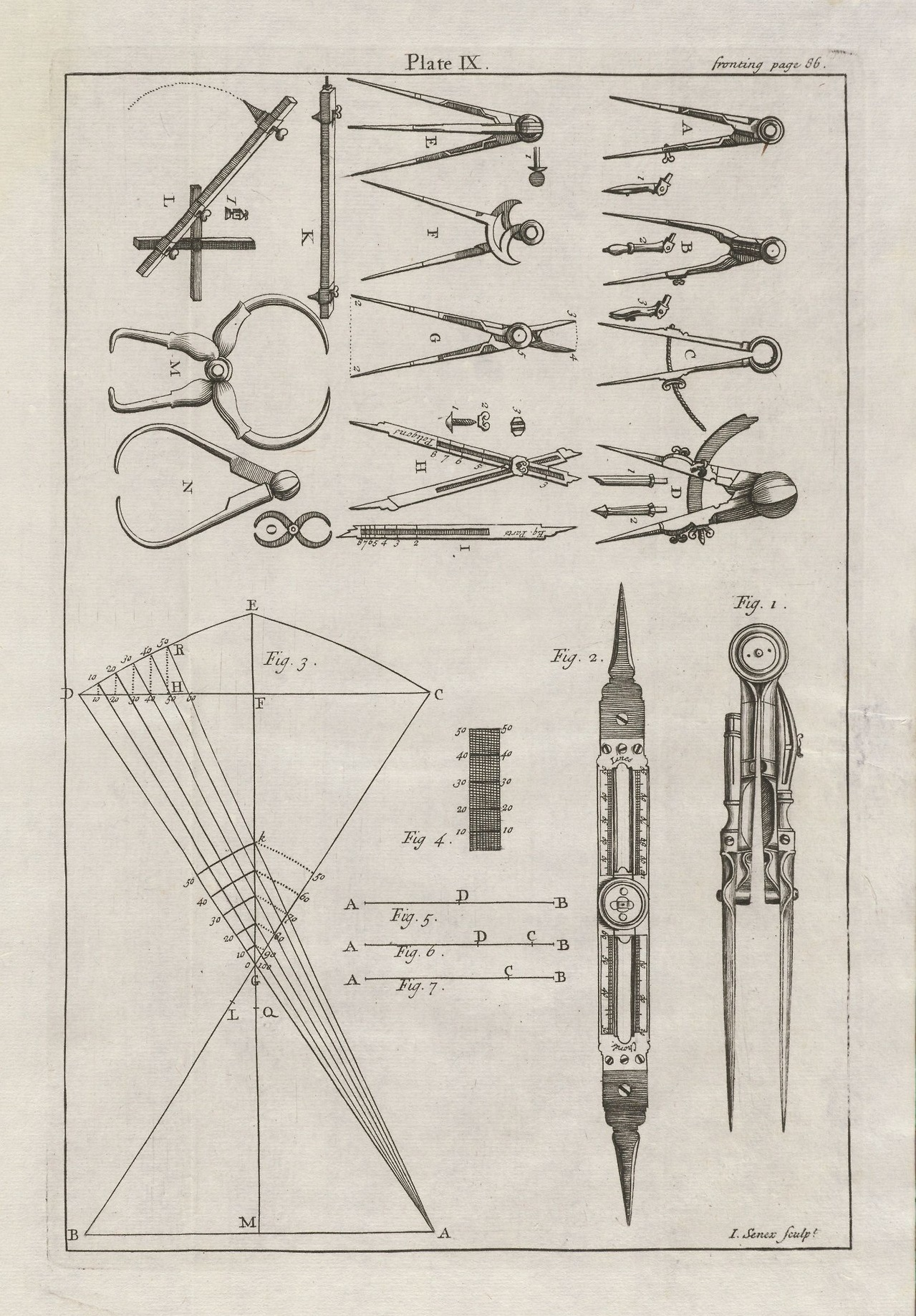
- Illustration, labeled plate IX
- Author: Nicholas Bion
- Original title: Traité de la construction et des principaux usages des instrumens de mathématique
- Translator: Edmund Stone
- Language: French
- Subject: Mathematical instruments
- Publisher: Paris
- Publication date: 1709
- Publication place: France
- English publication date: 1723
- Media type: Print
- Pages: [8] p., 347 p., [5], [28] leaves of plates
- OCLC: 48599327

The Construction and Principal Uses of Mathematical Instruments (French: Traité de la construction et des principaux usages des instrumens de mathématique) is a book by Nicholas Bion, first published in 1709. It was translated into English in 1723 by Edmund Stone.

The book describes ways to construct mathematical instruments. It was described as "the most famous book devoted to instruments" by historian of science David M. Knight.

== Nicholas Bion ==
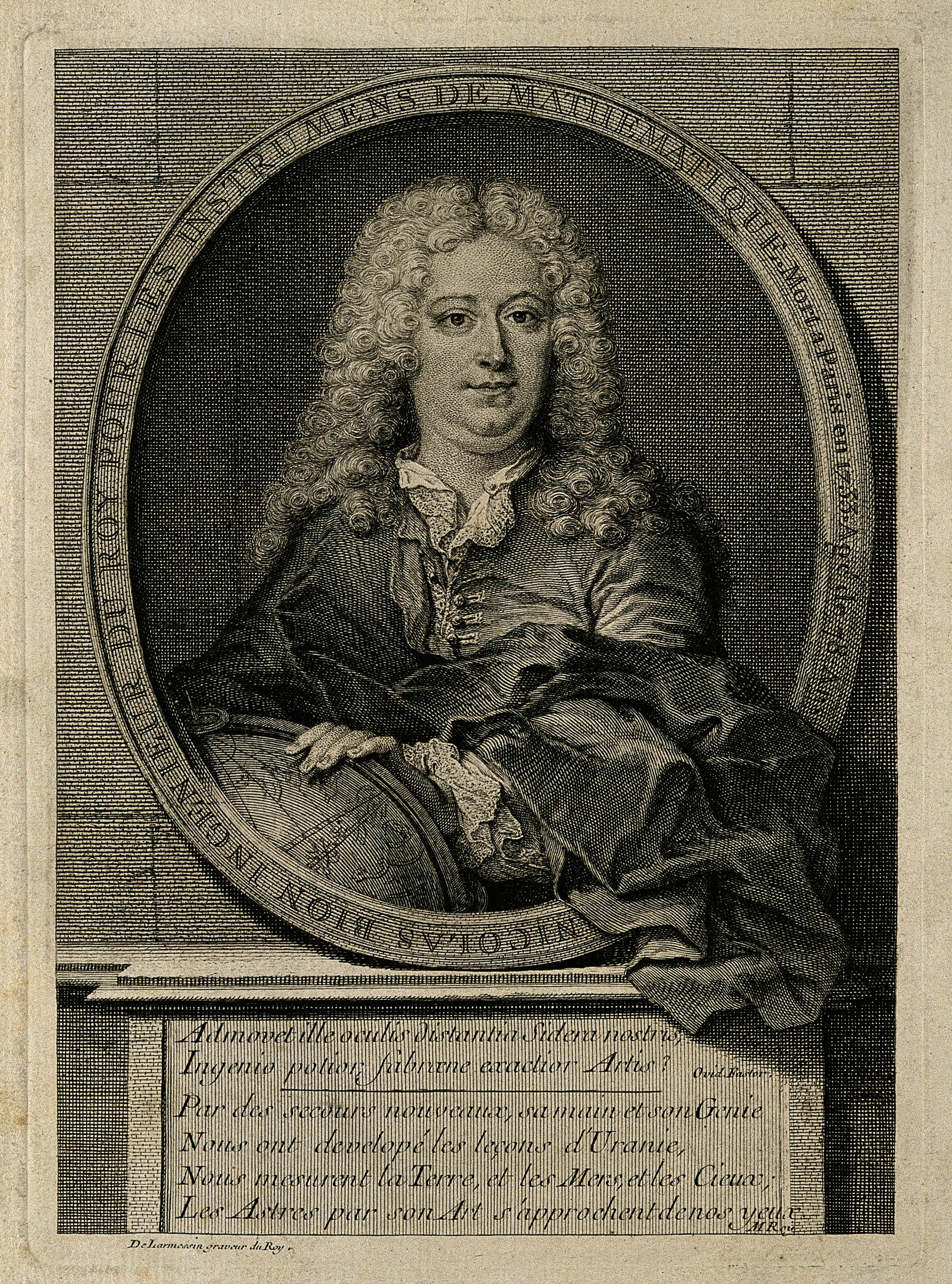
Nicholas Bion

Nicholas Bion (French: Nicolas Bion [bjɔ̃]; 1652–1733) was a French instrument maker and author with workshops in Paris. He was king's engineer for mathematical instruments. He died in Paris in 1733 aged 81.

=== Bibliography ===
Bion is the author of the following:

- L'usage des Globes Célestes et Terrestres et des sphères suivant les differents systèmes du Monde (Amsterdam, 1700)
- Usage des Astrolabes
- Traité de la construction et des principaux usages des instrumens de mathématique (Paris, 1709) (online version)
