= Sainte-Gemmes =

- Part of Oucques la Nouvelle
- Coat of arms
- Location of Sainte-Gemmes
- Location within France Location within Centre-Val de Loire
- Coordinates: 47°47′39″N 1°16′18″E
- Country: France
- Region: Centre-Val de Loire
- Department: Loir-et-Cher
- Arrondissement: Vendôme
- Canton: La Beauce
- Commune: Oucques la Nouvelle
- Area^{1}: 8.56 km^{2} (3.31 sq mi)
- Elevation: 110 m (360 ft)
- Highest elevation: 131 m (430 ft)
- Lowest elevation: 110 m (360 ft)
- Population (2022): 91
  - Density: 11/km^{2} (28/sq mi)
- Time zone: UTC+01:00 (CET)
  - Summer (DST): UTC+02:00 (CEST)
- Postal code: 41290
- ^{1} French Land Register data, which excludes lakes, ponds, glaciers > 1 km^{2} (0.386 sq mi or 247 acres) and river estuaries.

Sainte-Gemmes (French pronunciation: [sɛ̃t ʒɛm]) is a former commune in the Loir-et-Cher department of central France. On 1 January 2017, it was merged into the new commune Oucques la Nouvelle. Its population was 91 in 2022.

== See also ==
- Communes of the Loir-et-Cher department
