= Oucques la Nouvelle =

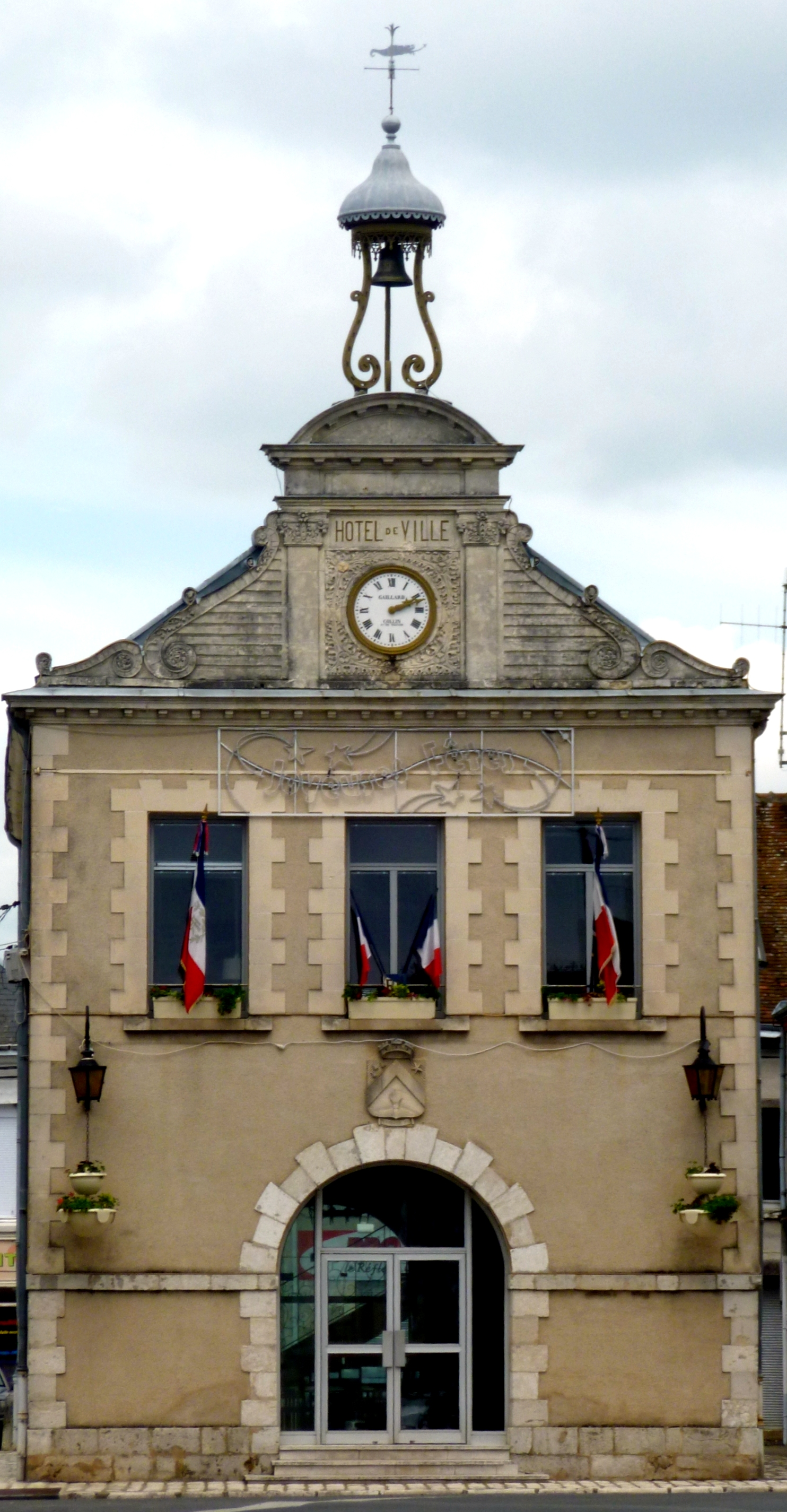
- Town hall
- Location of Oucques la Nouvelle
- Location within France Location within Centre-Val de Loire
- Coordinates: 47°49′26″N 1°17′46″E
- Country: France
- Region: Centre-Val de Loire
- Department: Loir-et-Cher
- Arrondissement: Blois
- Canton: La Beauce
- Intercommunality: Beauce Val de Loire
- Area^{1}: 49.37 km^{2} (19.06 sq mi)
- Highest elevation: 144 m (472 ft)
- Lowest elevation: 110 m (360 ft)
- Population (2023): 1,638
  - Density: 33.18/km^{2} (85.93/sq mi)
- Time zone: UTC+01:00 (CET)
  - Summer (DST): UTC+02:00 (CEST)
- INSEE/Postal code: 41171 /41290
- ^{1} French Land Register data, which excludes lakes, ponds, glaciers > 1 km^{2} (0.386 sq mi or 247 acres) and river estuaries.

Oucques la Nouvelle (French pronunciation: [uk la nuvɛl], literally Oucques the New) is a commune in the department of Loir-et-Cher in central France. The municipality was established on 1 January 2017 by merger of the former communes of Oucques, Baigneaux, Beauvilliers and Sainte-Gemmes.

== See also ==
- Communes of the Loir-et-Cher department
