= Mathematical instrument =

Tool used in the study or practice of mathematics

Animation of construction of a pentagon using a compass and straightedge

A mathematical instrument is a tool or device used in the study or practice of mathematics. In geometry, construction of various proofs was done using only a compass and straightedge; arguments in these proofs relied only on idealized properties of these instruments and literal construction was regarded as only an approximation. In applied mathematics, mathematical instruments were used for measuring angles and distances, in astronomy, navigation, surveying and in the measurement of time.

== Overview ==
The astrolabe was an early mathematical instrument used in astronomy and navigation.

Instruments such as the astrolabe, the quadrant, and others were used to measure and accurately record the relative positions and movements of planets and other celestial objects. The sextant and other related instruments were essential for navigation at sea.

Most instruments are used within the field of geometry, including the ruler, dividers, protractor, set square, compass, ellipsograph, T-square and opisometer. Others are used in arithmetic (for example the abacus, slide rule and calculator) or in algebra (the integraph). In astronomy, many have said the pyramids (along with Stonehenge) were actually instruments used for tracking the stars over long periods or for the annual planting seasons.

== In schools ==
The Oxford Set of Mathematical Instruments is a set of instruments used by generations of school children in the United Kingdom and around the world in mathematics and geometry lessons. It includes two set squares, a 180° protractor, a 15 cm ruler, a metal compass, a metal divider, a 9 cm pencil, a pencil sharpener, an eraser and a 10mm stencil.

== See also ==
- Measuring instrument
- Dividing engine, which greatly improved accuracy of divisions on measuring and mathematical scales
- Planimeter, a device for measuring area
- The Construction and Principal Uses of Mathematical Instruments, which described the state of the art in the early 18th century
