= Baigneaux, Loir-et-Cher =

Baigneaux
- Part of Oucques la Nouvelle
- Coat of arms
- Location of Baigneaux
- Location within France Location within Centre-Val de Loire
- Coordinates: 47°46′59″N 1°15′18″E
- Country: France
- Region: Centre-Val de Loire
- Department: Loir-et-Cher
- Arrondissement: Vendôme
- Canton: La Beauce
- Commune: Oucques la Nouvelle
- Area^{1}: 6.58 km^{2} (2.54 sq mi)
- Elevation: 123 m (404 ft)
- Highest elevation: 129 m (423 ft)
- Lowest elevation: 121 m (397 ft)
- Population (2023): 56
  - Density: 8.5/km^{2} (22/sq mi)
- Time zone: UTC+01:00 (CET)
  - Summer (DST): UTC+02:00 (CEST)
- Postal code: 41290
- ^{1} French Land Register data, which excludes lakes, ponds, glaciers > 1 km^{2} (0.386 sq mi or 247 acres) and river estuaries.

Baigneaux (French pronunciation: [bɛɲo]) is a former commune in the Loir-et-Cher department in central France. On 1 January 2017, it was merged into the new commune Oucques la Nouvelle.

== See also ==
- Communes of the Loir-et-Cher department
