= Oucques =

Commune in Loir-et-Cher, France

- Part of Oucques la Nouvelle
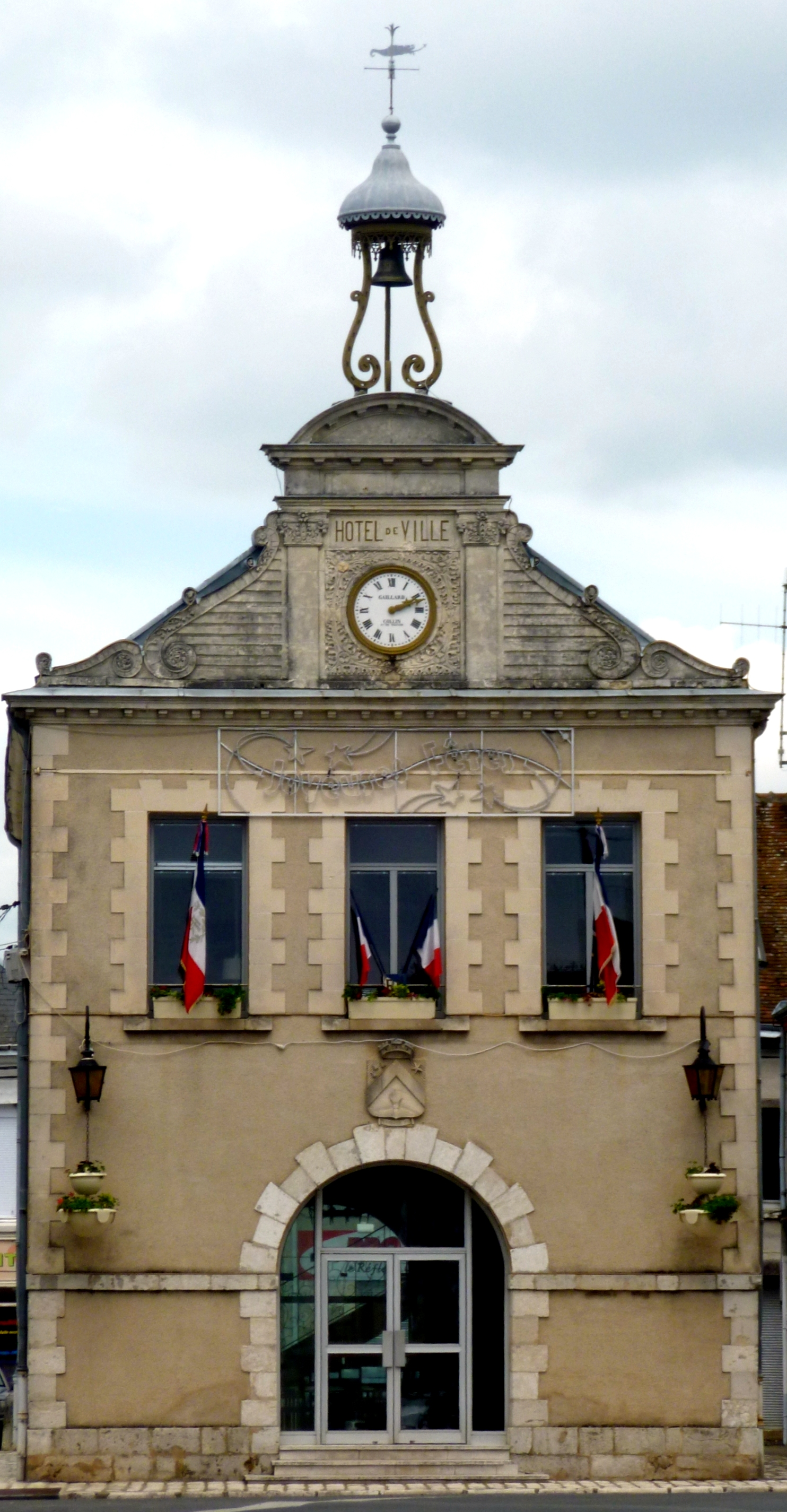
- The town hall in Oucques

- Coat of arms
- Location of Oucques
- Location within France Location within Centre-Val de Loire
- Coordinates: 47°49′28″N 1°17′44″E
- Country: France
- Region: Centre-Val de Loire
- Department: Loir-et-Cher
- Arrondissement: Blois
- Canton: La Beauce
- Commune: Oucques la Nouvelle
- Area^{1}: 26.23 km^{2} (10.13 sq mi)
- Elevation: 124 m (407 ft)
- Highest elevation: 139 m (456 ft)
- Lowest elevation: 115 m (377 ft)
- Population (2022): 1,446
  - Density: 55.13/km^{2} (142.8/sq mi)
- Time zone: UTC+01:00 (CET)
  - Summer (DST): UTC+02:00 (CEST)
- Postal code: 41290
- ^{1} French Land Register data, which excludes lakes, ponds, glaciers > 1 km^{2} (0.386 sq mi or 247 acres) and river estuaries.

Oucques (French pronunciation: [uk]) is a former commune in the Loir-et-Cher department of central France. On 1 January 2017, it was merged into the new commune Oucques la Nouvelle.

== See also ==
- Communes of the Loir-et-Cher department
