= Beauvilliers, Loir-et-Cher =

Beauvilliers
- Part of Oucques la Nouvelle
- Location of Beauvilliers
- Location within France Location within Centre-Val de Loire
- Coordinates: 47°50′20″N 1°15′18″E
- Country: France
- Region: Centre-Val de Loire
- Department: Loir-et-Cher
- Arrondissement: Blois
- Canton: La Beauce
- Commune: Oucques la Nouvelle
- Area^{1}: 8 km^{2} (3.1 sq mi)
- Elevation: 135 m (443 ft)
- Highest elevation: 144 m (472 ft)
- Lowest elevation: 120 m (390 ft)
- Population (2023): 53
  - Density: 6.6/km^{2} (17/sq mi)
- Time zone: UTC+01:00 (CET)
  - Summer (DST): UTC+02:00 (CEST)
- Postal code: 41290
- ^{1} French Land Register data, which excludes lakes, ponds, glaciers > 1 km^{2} (0.386 sq mi or 247 acres) and river estuaries.

Beauvilliers (French pronunciation: [bovilje]) is a former commune in the Loir-et-Cher department in central France. On 1 January 2017, it was merged into the new commune Oucques la Nouvelle.

== See also ==
- Communes of the Loir-et-Cher department
