= Baigneaux, Gironde =

Baigneaux
- Commune
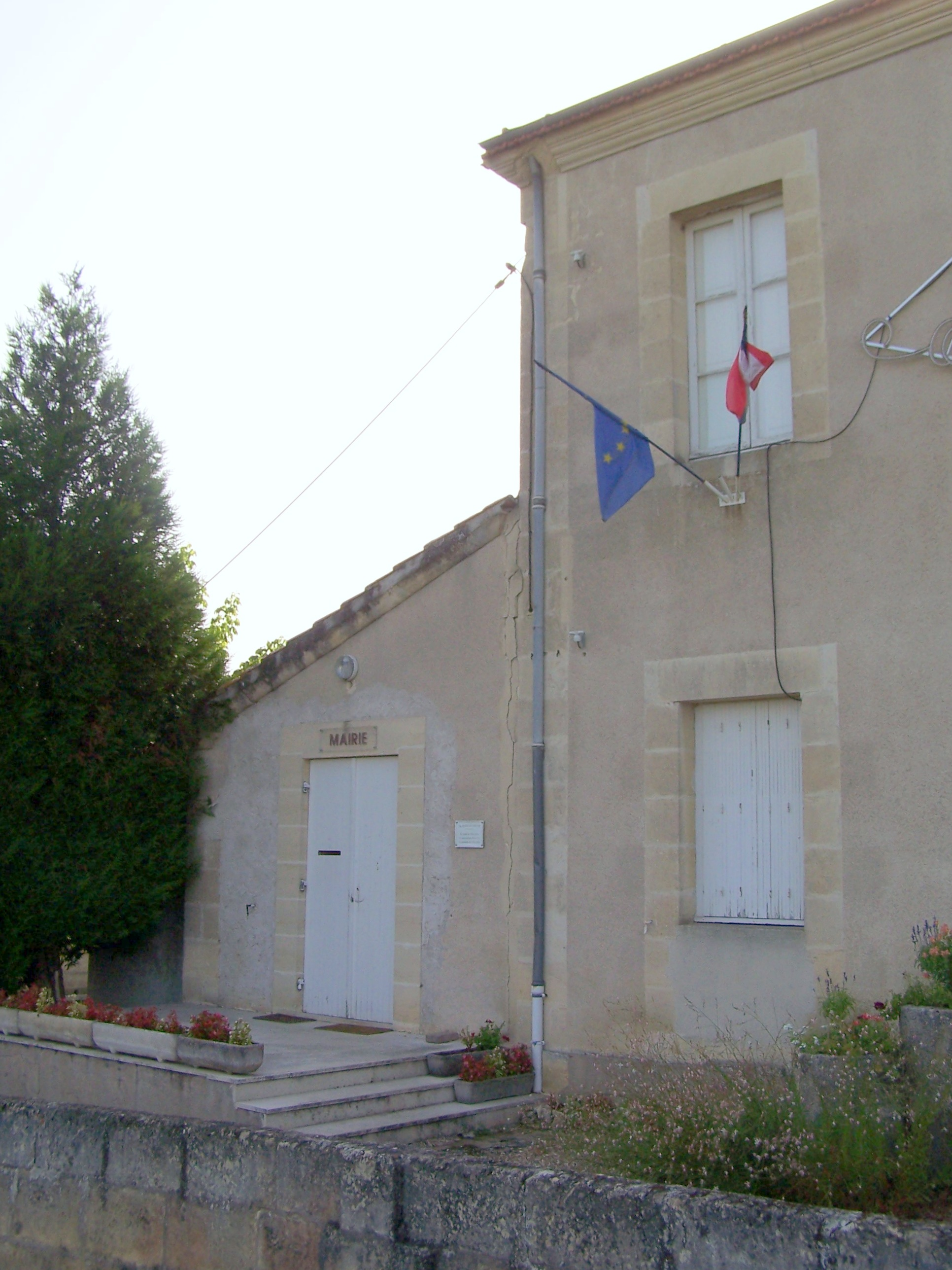
- Town hall

- Coat of arms
- Location of Baigneaux
- Location within France Location within Nouvelle-Aquitaine
- Coordinates: 44°43′25″N 0°11′45″W
- Country: France
- Region: Nouvelle-Aquitaine
- Department: Gironde
- Arrondissement: Langon
- Canton: L'Entre-Deux-Mers

Government
  - Mayor (2020–2026): Sandrine Allain
- Area^{1}: 7.93 km^{2} (3.06 sq mi)
- Elevation: 68 m (223 ft)
- Highest elevation: 90 m (300 ft)
- Lowest elevation: 32 m (105 ft)
- Population (2023): 451
  - Density: 56.9/km^{2} (147/sq mi)
- Time zone: UTC+01:00 (CET)
  - Summer (DST): UTC+02:00 (CEST)
- INSEE/Postal code: 33025 /33760
- ^{1} French Land Register data, which excludes lakes, ponds, glaciers > 1 km^{2} (0.386 sq mi or 247 acres) and river estuaries.

Baigneaux (French pronunciation: [beɲo]; Occitan: Banhaus) is a commune in the Gironde department in southwestern France.

== Population ==
Historical population
Year	Pop.	±% p.a.
1968	185	—
1975	153	−2.68%
1982	160	+0.64%
1990	221	+4.12%
1999	245	+1.15%
2007	308	+2.90%
2012	364	+3.40%
2017	438	+3.77%
2023	451	+0.49%
Source: INSEE

== See also ==
- Communes of the Gironde department
