= Guillaume de l'Hôpital =

French mathematician (1661–1704)

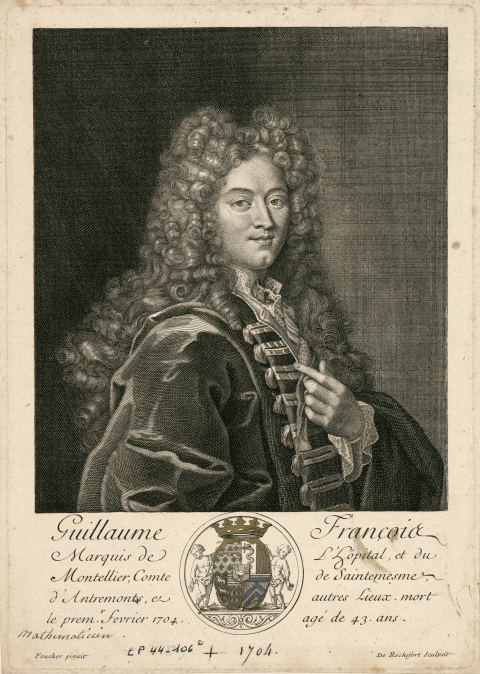
- Born: Guillaume François Antoine de l'Hôpital; 7 June 1661; Paris, France
- Died: 2 February 1704 (aged 42); Paris, France
- Known for: Infinitesimal calculus; Differential geometry of curves; L'Hôpital's rule
- Scientific career
- Fields: Mathematician
- Workplaces: French Academy of Sciences
- Academic advisors: Johann Bernoulli

Guillaume François Antoine, Marquis de l'Hôpital (French: [ɡijom fʁɑ̃swa ɑ̃twan maʁki də lopital]; 7 June 1661 – 2 February 1704) (Note: also known as Guillaume-François-Antoine Marquis de l'Hôpital, Marquis de Sainte-Mesme, Comte d'Entremont, and Seigneur d'Ouques-la-Chaise,) was a French mathematician. His name is firmly associated with l'Hôpital's rule for calculating limits involving indeterminate forms 0/0 and ∞/∞. Although the rule did not originate with l'Hôpital, it appeared in print for the first time in his 1696 treatise on the infinitesimal calculus, entitled Analyse des Infiniment Petits pour l'Intelligence des Lignes Courbes. This book was a first systematic exposition of differential calculus. Several editions and translations to other languages were published and it became a model for subsequent treatments of calculus.

== Biography ==
L'Hôpital was born into a military family. His father was Anne-Alexandre de l'Hôpital, a Lieutenant-General of the King's army, Comte de Saint-Mesme and the first squire of Gaston, Duke of Orléans. His mother was Elisabeth Gobelin, a daughter of Claude Gobelin, Intendant in the King's Army and Councilor of the State.

L'Hôpital abandoned a military career due to poor eyesight and pursued his interest in mathematics, which was apparent since his childhood. For a while, he was a member of Nicolas Malebranche's circle in Paris and it was there that in 1691 he met young Johann Bernoulli, who was visiting France and agreed to supplement his Paris talks on infinitesimal calculus with private lectures to l'Hôpital at his estate at Oucques. In 1693, l'Hôpital was elected to the French academy of sciences and even served twice as its vice-president. Among his accomplishments were the determination of the arc length of the logarithmic graph, one of the solutions to the brachistochrone problem, and the discovery of a turning point singularity on the involute of a plane curve near an inflection point.

L'Hôpital exchanged ideas with Pierre Varignon and corresponded with Gottfried Leibniz, Christiaan Huygens, and Jacob and Johann Bernoulli. His Traité analytique des sections coniques et de leur usage pour la résolution des équations dans les problêmes tant déterminés qu'indéterminés ("Analytic treatise on conic sections") was published posthumously in Paris in 1707.

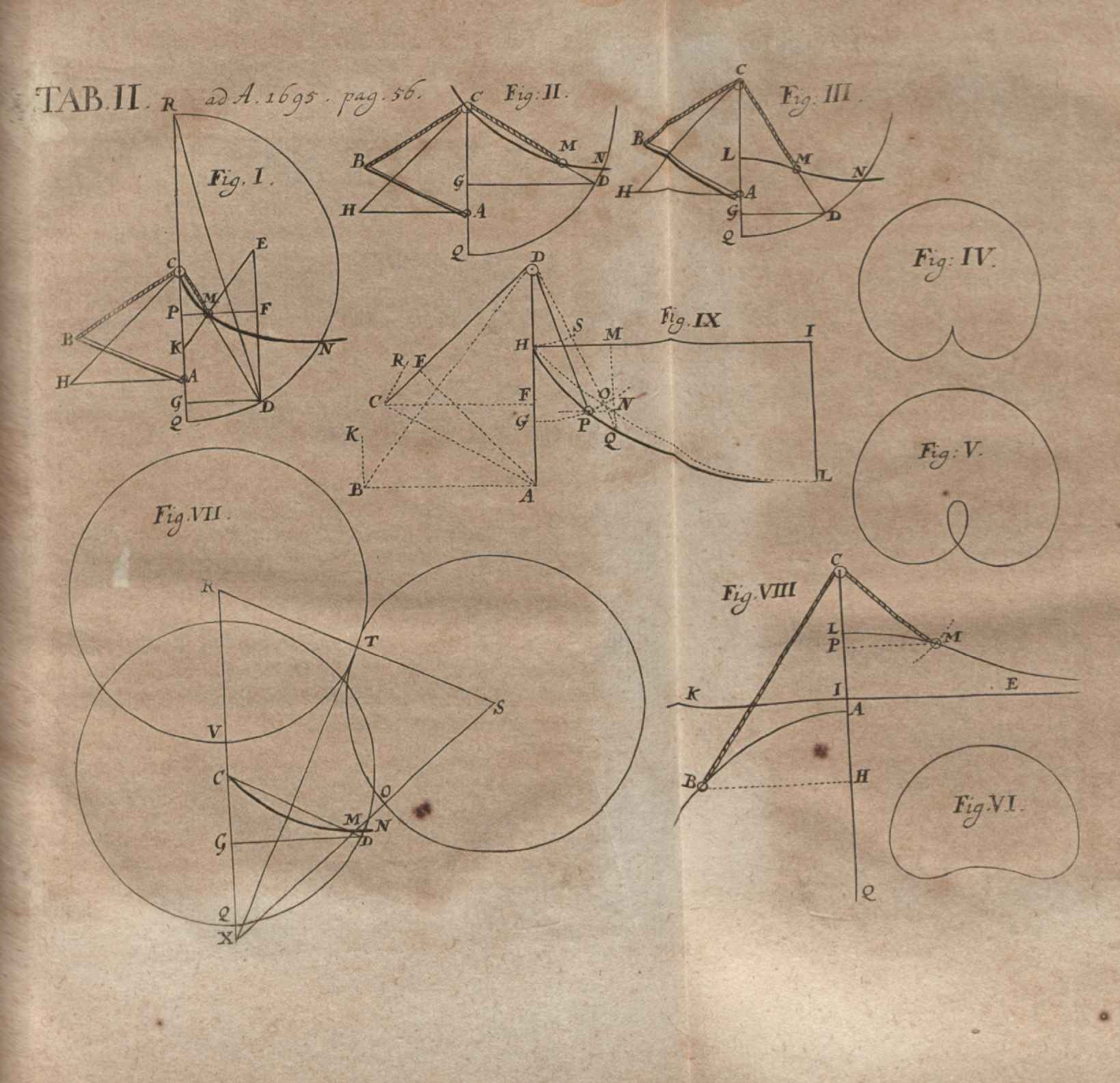
Illustration of Solutio problematis physico mathematici published in Acta Eruditorum, 1695

== Calculus textbook ==
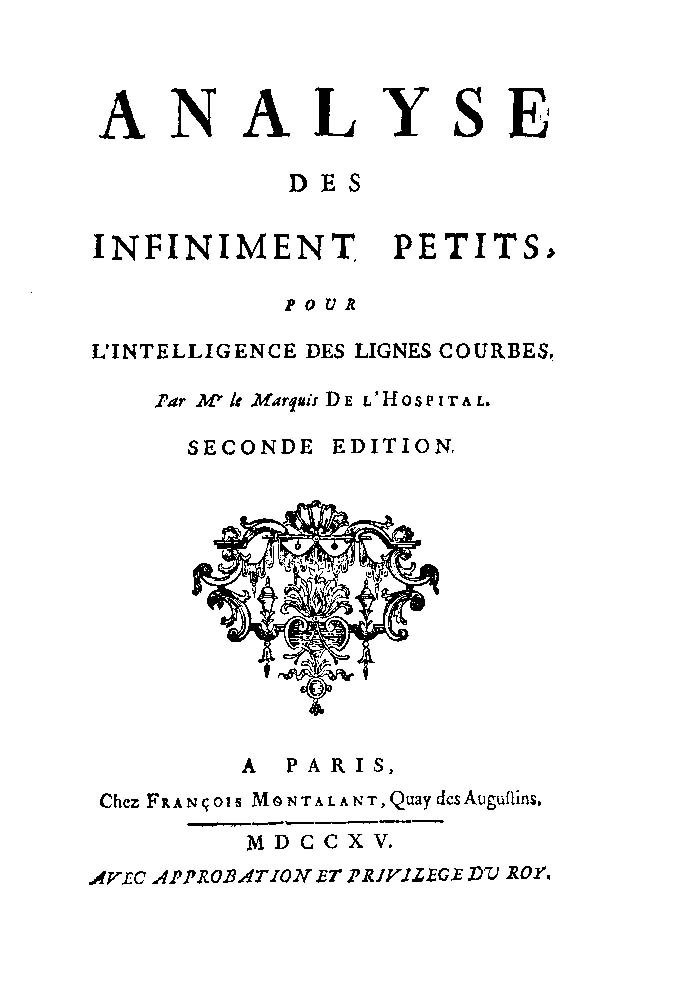
Analyse des Infiniment Petits pour l'Intelligence des Lignes Courbes, 1715

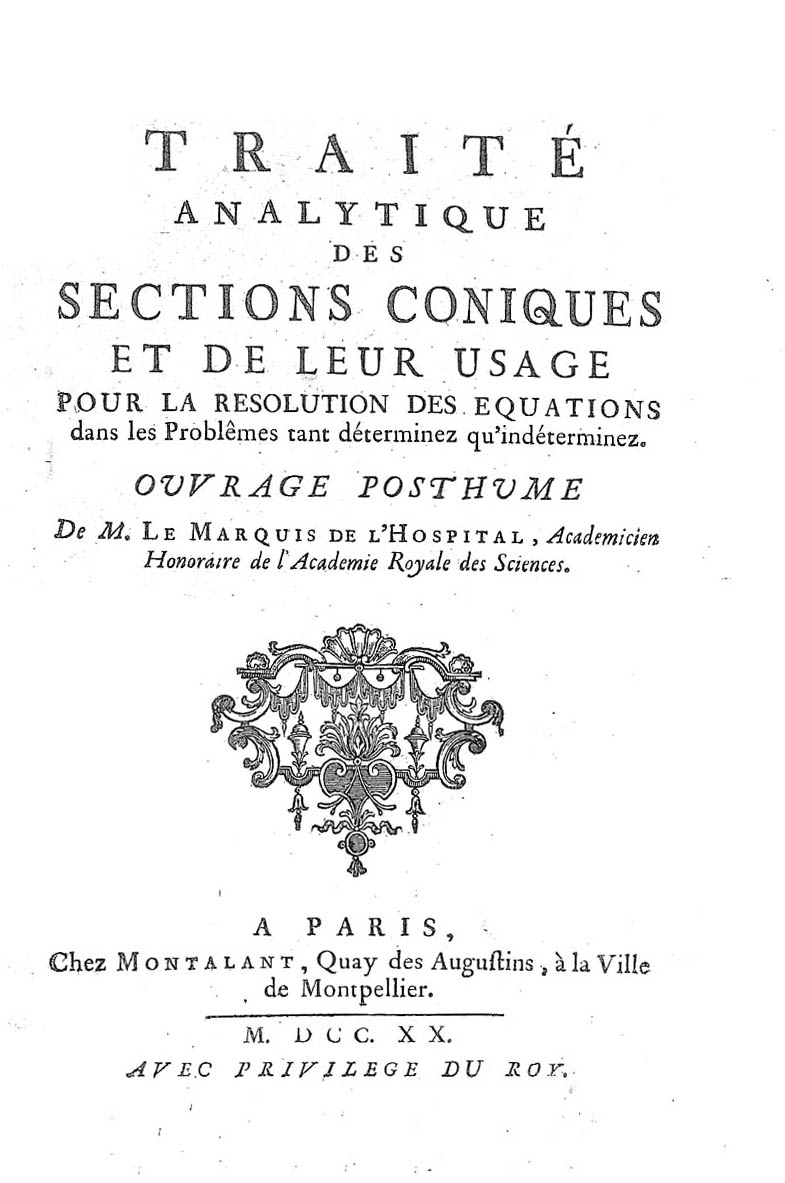
Traité analytique, 1720

In 1696 l'Hôpital published his book Analyse des Infiniment Petits pour l'Intelligence des Lignes Courbes ("Infinitesimal calculus with applications to curved lines"). This was the first textbook on infinitesimal calculus and it presented the ideas of differential calculus and their applications to differential geometry of curves in a lucid form and with numerous figures; however, it did not consider integration.

The history leading to the book's publication became a subject of a protracted controversy. In a letter from 17 March 1694, l'Hôpital made the following proposal to Johann Bernoulli: in exchange for an annual payment of 300 pounds, Bernoulli would inform l'Hôpital of his latest mathematical discoveries, withholding them from correspondence with others, including Varignon. Bernoulli's immediate response has not been preserved, but he must have agreed soon, as the subsequent letters show. L'Hôpital may have felt fully justified in describing these results in his book, after acknowledging his debt to Leibniz and the Bernoulli brothers, "especially the younger one" (Johann). Johann Bernoulli grew increasingly unhappy with the accolades bestowed on l'Hôpital's work and complained in private correspondence about being sidelined. After l'Hôpital's death, he publicly revealed their agreement and claimed credit for the statements and portions of the text of Analyse, which were supplied to l'Hôpital in letters. Over a period of many years, Bernoulli made progressively stronger allegations about his role in the writing of Analyse, culminating in the publication of his old work on integral calculus in 1742: he remarked that this is a continuation of his old lectures on differential calculus, which he discarded since l'Hôpital had already included them in his famous book. For a long time, these claims were not regarded as credible by many historians of mathematics, because l'Hôpital's mathematical talent was not in doubt, while Bernoulli was involved in several other priority disputes. For example, both H. G. Zeuthen and Moritz Cantor, writing at the cusp of the 20th century, dismissed Bernoulli's claims on these grounds. However, in 1921 Paul Schafheitlin discovered a manuscript of Bernoulli's lectures on differential calculus from 1691 to 1692 in the Basel University library. The text showed remarkable similarities to l'Hôpital's writing, substantiating Bernoulli's account of the book's origin.

== Personal life ==
L'Hôpital married Marie-Charlotte de Romilley de La Chesnelaye, also a mathematician and a member of the nobility, and inheritor of large estates in Brittany. Together, they had one son and three daughters. L'Hôpital died at the age of 42. The exact cause of his death is not widely recorded, and historical sources do not provide specific details regarding the circumstances of his passing.

== Bibliography ==
- G. L'Hôpital, E. Stone, The Method of Fluxions, both direct and inverse; the former being a translation from de l'Hospital's "Analyse des infinements petits," and the latter, supplied by the translator, Edmund Stone, London, 1730
- G. L'Hôpital, Analyse des Infiniment Petits pour l'Intelligence des Lignes Courbes, Paris, 1696
- G. L'Hôpital, Analyse des infinement petits, Paris 1715
- William Fox, Guillaume-François-Antoine de L'Hôpital, Catholic Encyclopedia, vol 7, New York, Robert Appleton Company, 1910
- C. Truesdell The New Bernoulli Edition Isis, Vol. 49, No. 1. (Mar., 1958), pp. 54–62, discusses the strange agreement between Bernoulli and de l'Hôpital on pages 59–62.
- A.P. Yushkevich (ed), History of mathematics from the most ancient times to the beginning of the 19th century, vol 2, Mathematics of the 17th century (in Russian). Moscow, Nauka, 1970 Zbl 0263.01002
