= Analyse des infiniment petits pour l'intelligence des lignes courbes =

Calculus textbook by Guillaume de l'Hôpital (1696)

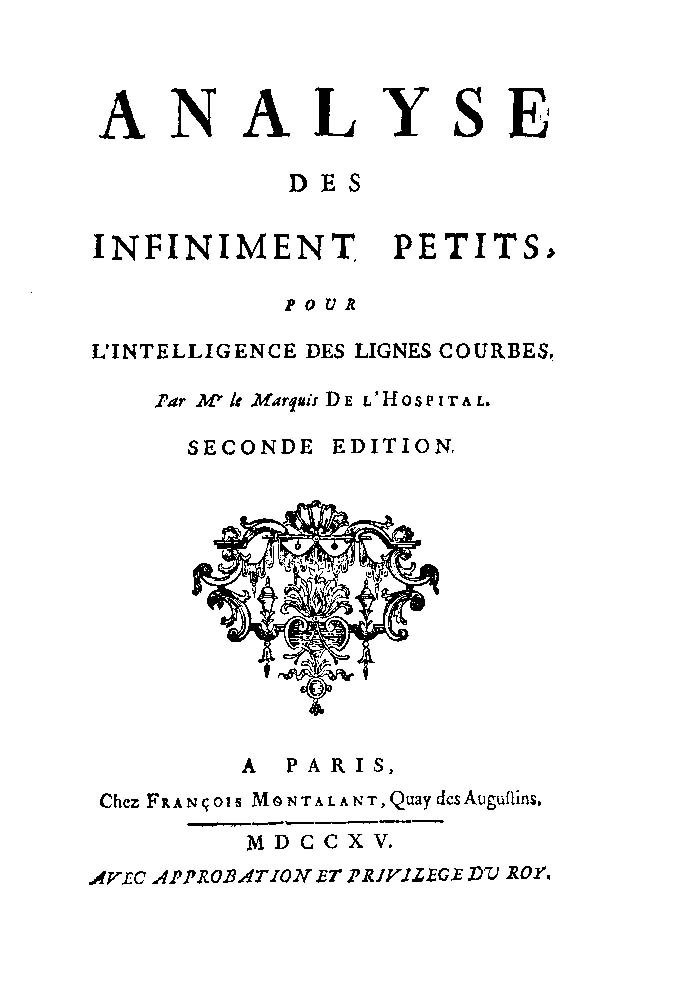
- 1715 edition
- Author: Guillaume de l'Hôpital
- Language: French
- Subject: Calculus
- Publisher: Imprimerie royale (Paris)
- Publication date: 1696
- Publication place: Paris, France

Analyse des Infiniment Petits pour l'Intelligence des Lignes Courbes (literal translation: Analysis of the infinitely small to understand curves) of 1696, is the first textbook published on the infinitesimal calculus of Gottfried Wilhelm Leibniz. It was written by the French mathematician Guillaume de l'Hôpital, and treated only the subject of differential calculus. Two volumes treating the differential and integral calculus, respectively, had been authored by Johann Bernoulli in 1691–1692, and the latter was published in 1724 to become the first published textbook on the integral calculus.

== L'Hôpital's rule ==
The book includes the first appearance of L'Hôpital's rule. The rule is believed to be the work of Johann Bernoulli, since l'Hôpital, a nobleman, paid Bernoulli a retainer of 300₣ per year to keep him updated on developments in calculus and to solve problems he had. Moreover, the two signed a contract allowing l'Hôpital to use Bernoulli's discoveries in any way he wished. Among these problems was that of limits of indeterminate forms. When l'Hôpital published his book, he gave due credit to Bernoulli and, not wishing to take credit for any of the mathematics in the book, he published the work anonymously. Bernoulli, who was known for being extremely jealous, claimed to be the author of the entire work. Nevertheless, the rule was named for l'Hôpital, who never claimed to have invented it in the first place.

== See also ==
- l'Hôpital controversy
