= List of Hungarian mathematicians =

The following is a list of Hungarian mathematicians. In this page we keep the names in Hungarian order (family name first).

== A ==
- Alexits, György (1899–1978)

== B ==
- Babai, László (born 1950) Paul Erdős Prize
- Bárány, Imre (born 1947) Paul Erdős Prize
- Beck, József (born 1952) Paul Erdős Prize
- Bollobás, Béla (born 1943) Senior Whitehead Prize
- Bolyai, Farkas (1775–1856)
- Bolyai, János (1802–1860), spoke 10 languages, vital in the systematic equations behind Non-Euclidean Geometry
- Bott, Raoul (1923–2005) Steele Prize
- Barabási, Albert-László (born 1967)

== C ==
- Császár, Ákos (1924–2017)
- Csörgő, Sándor (1947–2008) Paul Erdős Prize

== D ==
- Dienes, Zoltán Pál (1916–2014)

== E ==
- Erdős, Pál (1913–1996)

== F ==
- Fejér, Lipót (1880–1959)

== G ==
- Grossmann, Marcell (1878–1936)
- Farkas, Gyula (1847–1930)

== H ==
- Haar, Alfréd (1885–1933)
- Hajnal, András (1931–2016)
- Hajós, György (1912–1972)
- Halász, Gábor (born 1941) Paul Erdős Prize
- Hatvani, István (1718–1786)
- Hell, Miksa (1720–1792), worked as an astronomer

== I ==
- Izsák, Imre (1929–1965)

== J ==
- Juhász, István (born 1943) Paul Erdős Prize

== K ==
- Kalmár, László (1905–1976)
- Kármán, Tódor (1881–1963)
- Katona, Gyula O. H. (born 1941)
- Katona, Gyula Y. (born 1965)
- Kemény, János (1926–1992)
- Komjáth, Péter (born 1953) Paul Erdős Prize
- Komlós, János (born 1942)
- Kőnig, Dénes (1884–1944)
- Kőnig, Gyula (1849–1913)
- Kürschák, József (1864–1933)

== L ==
- Laczkovich, Miklós (born 1948) Paul Erdős Prize
- Lánczos, Kornél (1893–1974)
- Lax, Péter (1926–2025)
- Lovász, László (born 1948) Paul Erdős Prize

== M ==
- Mérő, László (born 1949)
- Medgyessy, Pál (1919–1977)

== N ==
- Nagy, Károly (1797–1868)
- Neumann, János (John von Neumann) (1903–1957), pioneer of computing and game theory

== O ==
- Ottlik, Géza (1912–1990)

== P ==
- Pálfy, Péter Pál (born 1955) Paul Erdős Prize
- Péter, Rózsa (1905–1977)
- Petzval, József (1807–1891)
- Pintz, János, (born 1950) Paul Erdős Prize
- Pólya, György (1887–1985)
- Pósa, Lajos (born 1947)
- Prékopa, András (1929–2016)
- Pyber, László (born 1960)

== R ==
- Radó, Tibor (1895–1965)
- Rényi, Alfréd (1921–1970)
- Riesz, Frigyes (1880–1956)
- Riesz, Marcel (1886–1969)
- Ruzsa, Imre Z. (born 1953) Paul Erdős Prize

== S ==
- Sajnovics, János (1733–1785)
- Sárközy, András (born 1941) Paul Erdős Prize
- Scholtz, Ágoston (1844–1916)
- Segner, János András (1704–1777)
- Sós, Vera T. (1930–2023)
- Süli, Endre (born 1956) Naylor Prize and Lectureship

== Sz ==
- Szegedy, Balázs Paul Erdős and Fulkerson Prizes
- Szegedy, Márió (born 1960) Gödel Prize
- Szemerédi, Endre (born 1940) Paul Erdős and Abel Prizes
- Szekeres, György (1911–2005)
- Szőkefalvi-Nagy, Béla (1913–1998)
- Szőnyi, Tamás (born 1957) Paul Erdős Prize
- Szüsz, Peter (1924–2008)

== T ==
- Tardos, Éva (born 1957)
- Tardos, Gábor (born 1964) Paul Erdős Prize
- Turán, Pál (1910–1976)

== V ==
- Vargha, András (born 1949)
