= Combinatorica =

- Discipline: Mathematics
- Language: English
- Edited by: Imre Bárány and József Solymosi

Publication details
- History: 1981 to present
- Publisher: Springer for the János Bolyai Mathematical Society (Germany)
- Frequency: Bimonthly

Standard abbreviations
- ISO 4: Combinatorica

Indexing
- ISSN: 0209-9683 (print); 1439-6912 (web)

Links
- Journal homepage

Combinatorica is an international journal of mathematics, publishing papers in the fields of combinatorics and computer science. It started in 1981, with László Babai and László Lovász as the editors-in-chief with Paul Erdős as honorary editor-in-chief. The current editors-in-chief are Imre Bárány and József Solymosi. The advisory board consists of Ronald Graham, Gyula O. H. Katona, Miklós Simonovits, Vera Sós, and Endre Szemerédi. It is published by the János Bolyai Mathematical Society and Springer Verlag.

The following members of the Hungarian School of Combinatorics have strongly contributed to the journal as authors, or have served as editors: Miklós Ajtai, László Babai, József Beck, András Frank, Péter Frankl, Zoltán Füredi, András Hajnal, Gyula Katona, László Lovász, László Pyber, Alexander Schrijver, Miklós Simonovits, Vera Sós, Endre Szemerédi, Tamás Szőnyi, Éva Tardos, Gábor Tardos.

== Notable publications ==
- A paper by Martin Grötschel, László Lovász, and Alexander Schrijver on the ellipsoid method, awarded the 1982 Fulkerson Prize.

M. Grötschel, L. Lovász, A. Schrijver: The ellipsoid method and its consequences in combinatorial optimization, Combinatorica, 1(1981), 169–197.

- József Beck's paper on the discrepancy of hypergraphs, awarded the 1985 Fulkerson Prize.

J. Beck: Roth's estimate of the discrepancy of integer sequences is nearly sharp, Combinatorica, 1(1981), 319–325.

- Karmarkar's algorithm solving linear programming problems in polynomial time, awarded the 1988 Fulkerson Prize.

N. Karmarkar: A New Polynomial Time Algorithm for Linear Programming, Combinatorica, 4(1984), 373–395.

- Szegedy's solution of Graham problem on common divisors

M. Szegedy: The solution of Graham's greatest common divisor problem, Combinatorica, 6(1986), 67–71.

- Éva Tardos's paper, awarded the 1988 Fulkerson Prize.

E. Tardos, A strongly polynomial minimum cost circulation algorithm, Combinatorica, 5(1985), 247–256.

- The proof of El-Zahar and Norbert Sauer of the Hedetniemi's conjecture for 4-chromatic graphs.

M. El-Zahar, N. W. Sauer: The chromatic number of the product of two 4-chromatic graphs is 4, Combinatorica, 5(1985), 121–126.

- Bollobás's asymptotic value of the chromatic number of random graphs.

B. Bollobás: The chromatic number of random graphs, Combinatorica, 8(1988), 49–55.

- Neil Robertson, Paul Seymour, and Robin Thomas, proving Hadwiger's conjecture in the case k=6, awarded the 1994 Fulkerson Prize.

N. Robertson, P. D. Seymour, R. Thomas: Hadwiger's conjecture for K_{6}-free graphs, Combinatorica, 13 (1993), 279–361.
