= Miklós Schweitzer Competition =

Hungarian mathematics competition

The Miklós Schweitzer Competition (Schweitzer Miklós Matematikai Emlékverseny in Hungarian) is an annual Hungarian mathematics competition for university students, established in 1949. The year someone acquires their MSc diploma is the last year in which they can compete.

It is named after Miklós Schweitzer (1 February 1923 – 28 January 1945), a young Jewish Hungarian mathematician who was killed by the Nazis shortly before the Siege of Budapest in the Second World War.

The problems, written by Hungarian mathematicians, are require in-depth knowledge of the fields represented. The competition is open-book and competitors are allowed ten days to come up with solutions.

The problems on the competition can be classified roughly in the following categories: 1. Algebra 2. Combinatorics 3. Theory of Functions 4. Geometry 5. Measure Theory 6. Number Theory 7. Operators 8. Probability Theory 9. Sequences and Series 10. Topology 11. Set Theory

Many prominent mathematicians have participated in the competition since its establishment. The following people have received a first prize: Kocsis Anett, Gáspár Attila, Borbényi Márton, Szőke Tamás, Maga Balázs, Nagy János, Mészáros András, Tomon István, Lovász László Miklós, Strenner Balázs, Hubai Tamás, Harangi Viktor, Varjú Péter, Máthé András, Terpai Tamás, Kun Gábor, Braun Gábor, Frenkel Péter, Szegedy Balázs, Csörnyei Marianna, Lakos Gyula, Bíró András, Benczúr András, Erdős László, Kós Géza, Szabó Zoltán, Magyar Ákos, Tardos Gábor, Magyar Zoltán, Ivanyos Gábor, Kollár János, Totik Vilmos, Göndöcs Ferenc, Ruzsa Imre, Lempert László, Babai László, Komjáth Péter, Nagy Zsigmond, Lovász László, Gács Péter, Makai Endre, Máté Attila, Bollobás Béla, Simonovits Miklós, Fritz József, Vámos Péter, Elbert Árpád, Sárközy András, Halász Gábor, Makkai Mihály, Csiszár Imre, Kántor Sándor, Kovács László, Heppes Aladár, Hajnal András, Korányi Ádám, Pollák György, Gehér László, Kővári Tamás, Blum Ottó, Takács Lajos.

For a couple of years (2017-2022) a similar competition was also organized in France.
