= András Recski =

Hungarian mathematician (born 1948)

- Recski András
- Born: 21 April 1948 (age 78); Budapest, Hungary
- Citizenship: Hungarian
- Education: Eötvös Loránd University (diploma, dr. rer. nat.); Hungarian Academy of Sciences (CSc, DSc)
- Known for: Applications of matroids to electric networks and statics
- Scientific career
- Fields: Matroid theory, combinatorial optimization, electrical network theory, rigidity theory
- Workplaces: Budapest University of Technology and Economics; Eötvös Loránd University; Research Institute for Telecommunication (TKI), Budapest; Aquincum Institute of Technology
- Thesis: Matroidok és villamos hálózatok (Matroids and electric networks) (1977)
- Doctoral advisor: Vera T. Sós; László Lovász
- Doctoral students: Gyula Y. Katona
- Website: www.cs.bme.hu/~recski/

András Recski (Hungarian: [ˈrɛt͡ʃki ˈɒndraːʃ]; born 21 April 1948) is a Hungarian mathematician working in matroid theory and combinatorial optimization, and especially in their applications to the theory of electric networks and to rigidity in statics. He is professor emeritus at the Budapest University of Technology and Economics (BME), where he headed the Department of Computer Science and Information Theory from 1990 to 2011, and a Doctor of the Hungarian Academy of Sciences. He was secretary-general of the János Bolyai Mathematical Society from 2006 to 2015.

== Education ==
Recski was born in Budapest on 21 April 1948. He studied mathematics at Eötvös Loránd University, graduating in 1971, and obtained the university doctorate (dr. rer. nat.) in 1973. In 1977 he received the degree of Candidate of Sciences from the Hungarian Academy of Sciences for the dissertation Matroidok és villamos hálózatok ("Matroids and electric networks", 1976), supervised by Vera T. Sós and László Lovász, and in 1984 the degree of Doctor of the Mathematical Sciences, for the dissertation Matroidok és alkalmazásaik lineáris hálózatok kvalitatív vizsgálatában ("Matroids and their applications in the qualitative analysis of linear networks", 1983).

== Career ==
From 1971 to 1984 Recski was a researcher at the Research Institute for Telecommunication (Távközlési Kutató Intézet, TKI) in Budapest, while also lecturing at Eötvös Loránd University from 1972. In 1984 he became a founding member of the university's new Department of Computer Science and was appointed professor there in 1988.

In 1990 he moved to the Budapest University of Technology and Economics (BME) to head the Department of Mathematics of the Faculty of Electrical Engineering, while retaining a part-time professorship at Eötvös Loránd University. He headed the department (later renamed Department of Computer Science and Information Theory) from 1990 until 2011. He was succeeded as head by his former doctoral student Gyula Y. Katona and became professor emeritus in 2017.

Since 2009 Recski has been the academic director of the Aquincum Institute of Technology.

Recski is the co-author of three Hungarian-language university textbooks used as course texts at several Hungarian universities: A számítástudomány alapjai ("Foundations of computer science"), Rendszeroptimalizálás ("Systems optimization") and the problem collection Gráfelméleti feladatok ("Problems in graph theory").

He was secretary-general of the János Bolyai Mathematical Society from 2006 to 2015, and was vice-chair of the Mathematics Committee of the Hungarian Academy of Sciences from 1999 to 2005.

== Research ==
Recski's research concerns matroid theory and combinatorial optimization and their use in engineering, in particular in the analysis of electric networks, in the design of VLSI circuits, and in the rigidity of bar-and-joint and tensegrity frameworks.

In 1981 he conjectured that a generalization of the matroid parity problem can be solved in polynomial time. The conjecture was proved by Jácint Szabó in 2008, using Lovász's linear matroid parity algorithm and a technique on jump systems due to András Sebő, with applications to rigidity and to the unique solvability of linear networks. In 1982, he conjectured that the union of graphic matroids, if it is not itself graphic, is never binary. The conjecture remains open in general, and he has returned to it in joint work with his doctoral student Csongor Csehi. He co-edited with Lovász the proceedings of that colloquium, the first of the society's international colloquia devoted entirely to matroid theory.

His 1989 monograph Matroid Theory and its Applications in Electric Network Theory and in Statics has been described as the most comprehensive treatment of the applications of matroid theory available. More recently he has worked on the classification and synthesis of linear multiports.

== Awards and honours ==
- Grünwald Géza Memorial Prize of the János Bolyai Mathematical Society (1975)
- Farkas Gyula Memorial Prize of the János Bolyai Mathematical Society (1977)
- John von Neumann Research Prize, University of Bonn (1998)
- Eötvös József Prize of the Minister of Human Resources (2013)
