= Gyula Y. Katona =

Hungarian mathematician (born 1965)

- Katona Gyula Y.
- Born: 4 December 1965 (age 60); Budapest, Hungary
- Citizenship: Hungarian
- Education: Eötvös Loránd University (MSc); Hungarian Academy of Sciences (CSc, DSc)
- Known for: Hamiltonian cycles in hypergraphs Graph toughness Graph pebbling
- Relatives: Gyula O. H. Katona (father)
- Awards: Officer's Cross of the Order of Merit of Hungary (2026); Rényi Kató Memorial Prize (1991)
- Scientific career
- Fields: Graph theory, combinatorics, algorithms
- Workplaces: Budapest University of Technology and Economics; Alfréd Rényi Institute of Mathematics; Ibaraki University; Arizona State University
- Thesis: Paths and Cycles in Graphs and Hypergraphs (1997)
- Doctoral advisor: László Lovász; András Recski
- Website: www.cs.bme.hu/~kiskat/enghomepage.html

Gyula Y. Katona (Hungarian: [ˈkɒtonɒ ˈɟulɒ]; born 4 December 1965) is a Hungarian mathematician working in graph theory and combinatorics. He is a professor and head of the Department of Computer Science and Information Theory at the Budapest University of Technology and Economics (BME), and a Doctor of the Hungarian Academy of Sciences. His research concerns Hamiltonian cycles in graphs and hypergraphs, graph toughness, factors, and graph pebbling. In 2026 he was awarded the Officer's Cross of the Order of Merit of Hungary.

== Early life and education ==
Katona was born in Budapest in 1965, the son of the mathematician Gyula O. H. Katona. He attended the Fazekas Mihály Gimnázium and studied mathematics at Eötvös Loránd University from 1986 to 1991. His diploma thesis, A Few Versions of the Hamiltonian Cycle Problem, was supervised by László Lovász and András Recski. He continued as a doctoral student at the same university from 1991 to 1994, and in 1997 received the degree of Candidate of Sciences from the Hungarian Academy of Sciences for the dissertation Paths and Cycles in Graphs and Hypergraphs, again under the supervision of Lovász and Recski. In 2024 he was awarded the degree of Doctor of the Hungarian Academy of Sciences.

== Career ==
From 1994 to 1997 Katona was a research assistant professor in the combinatorics department of the Mathematical Institute of the Hungarian Academy of Sciences, and from 1997 to 1999 he held a JSPS postdoctoral fellowship at Ibaraki University in Japan. He joined the Department of Computer Science and Information Theory at the Budapest University of Technology and Economics in 1997, became an associate professor in 2002, and has headed the department since 2011. He was appointed full professor by the President of Hungary with effect from 1 September 2025. He was a visiting professor at Arizona State University in 2006–2007, and has taught in the Budapest Semesters in Mathematics programme since 2003 and at the Aquincum Institute of Technology since 2010.

Katona was managing editor of the Hungarian-language journal Matematikai Lapok from 1994 to 1997, and serves on the editorial boards of the AKCE International Journal of Graphs and Combinatorics and the International Journal of Computer Mathematics.

== Research ==
Katona's research lies at the interface of graph theory and the theory of algorithms. Much of his early work concerns Hamiltonian cycles and their variants. With Henry Kierstead he introduced a notion of Hamiltonian chains in uniform hypergraphs, the objects now commonly called tight Hamiltonian cycles, and gave a Dirac-type sufficient condition for their existence. The question of the optimal minimum-degree threshold became known as the Katona–Kierstead conjecture and was later proved in asymptotic form by Vojtěch Rödl, Andrzej Ruciński and Endre Szemerédi. His other work includes results on graph toughness and its edge and local variants, on factors of graphs, on Hamiltonian-saturated graphs and hypergraphs, and on graph pebbling and rubbling.

He is the coauthor of three textbooks: Combinatorics, Graph Theory and Algorithms (with András Recski, Technical University of Budapest, 1993), Introduction to Finite Mathematics (Eötvös Loránd University, 1993) and Introduction to Computer Science (Typotex, Budapest, 2002).

== Awards and honours ==
- Rényi Kató Memorial Prize of the János Bolyai Mathematical Society (1991)
- Officer's Cross of the Order of Merit of Hungary, civil division (2026), for his research on hypergraphs and his role in the mathematical education of engineers
