= Katalin Vesztergombi =

Hungarian mathematician (born 1948)

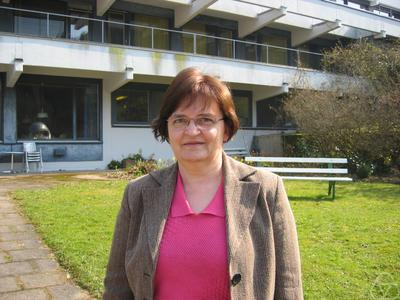
- Born: July 17, 1948 (age 78)
- Spouse: László Lovász

Academic background
- Education: Fazekas Mihály Gimnázium
- Alma mater: Eötvös Loránd University
- Thesis: Distribution of Distances in Finite Point Sets
- Doctoral advisor: Vera Sós

Academic work
- Discipline: Mathematics
- Institutions: Eötvös Loránd University
- Notable works: Discrete Mathematics: Elementary and Beyond

Katalin Vesztergombi (born July 17, 1948) is a Hungarian mathematician known for her contributions to graph theory and discrete geometry. A student of Vera T. Sós and a co-author of Paul Erdős, she is an emeritus associate professor at Eötvös Loránd University.

== Education ==
As a high-school student in the 1960s, Vesztergombi became part of a special class for gifted mathematics students at Fazekas Mihály Gimnázium with her future collaborators László Lovász, József Pelikán, and others. She completed her Ph.D. in 1987 at Eötvös Loránd University. Her dissertation, Distribution of Distances in Finite Point Sets, is connected to the Erdős distinct distances problem and was supervised by Vera Sós.

== Contributions ==
Vesztergombi's research contributions include works on permutations,^{[PR]} graph coloring and graph products,^{[XN]} combinatorial discrepancy theory,^{[SS]} distance problems in discrete geometry,^{[LD]} geometric graph theory,^{[GR]} the rectilinear crossing number of the complete graph,^{[CQ]} and graphons.^{[D1]}^{[D2]}

With László Lovász and József Pelikán, she is the author of the textbook Discrete Mathematics: Elementary and Beyond.^{[DM]}

== Personal ==
Vesztergombi is married to László Lovász, with whom she is also a frequent research collaborator.

== Selected publications ==
=== Books ===
DM.	Lovász, L.; Pelikán, J.; Vesztergombi, K. (2003), Discrete Mathematics: Elementary and Beyond, Undergraduate Texts in Mathematics, New York: Springer-Verlag, doi:10.1007/b97469, ISBN 0-387-95584-4, MR 1952453

=== Research articles ===
PR.	Vesztergombi, K. (1974), "Permutations with restriction of middle strength", Studia Scientiarum Mathematicarum Hungarica, 9: 181–185 (1975), MR 0373917

XN.	Vesztergombi, K. (1978–1979), "Some remarks on the chromatic number of the strong product of graphs", Acta Cybernetica, 4 (2): 207–212, MR 0525046

SS.	Lovász, L.; Spencer, J.; Vesztergombi, K. (1986), "Discrepancy of set-systems and matrices", European Journal of Combinatorics, 7 (2): 151–160, doi:10.1016/S0195-6698(86)80041-5, MR 0856328

LD.	Erdős, P.; Lovász, L.; Vesztergombi, K. (1989), "On the graph of large distances", Discrete & Computational Geometry, 4 (6): 541–549, doi:10.1007/BF02187746, MR 1006077

GR.	Lovász, L.; Vesztergombi, K. (2002), "Geometric representations of graphs", Paul Erdős and his mathematics, II (Budapest, 1999), Bolyai Society Mathematical Studies, vol. 11, Budapest: János Bolyai Mathematical Society, pp. 471–498, MR 1954739

CQ.	Lovász, László; Vesztergombi, Katalin; Wagner, Uli; Welzl, Emo (2004), "Convex quadrilaterals and k-sets", Towards a theory of geometric graphs, Contemporary Mathematics, vol. 342, Providence, RI: American Mathematical Society, pp. 139–148, doi:10.1090/conm/342/06138, ISBN 978-0-8218-3484-8, MR 2065260

D1.	Borgs, C.; Chayes, J. T.; Lovász, L.; Sós, V. T.; Vesztergombi, K. (2008), "Convergent sequences of dense graphs. I. Subgraph frequencies, metric properties and testing", Advances in Mathematics, 219 (6): 1801–1851, arXiv:math/0702004, doi:10.1016/j.aim.2008.07.008, MR 2455626, S2CID 5974912

D2.	Borgs, C.; Chayes, J. T.; Lovász, L.; Sós, V. T.; Vesztergombi, K. (2012), "Convergent sequences of dense graphs II. Multiway cuts and statistical physics", Annals of Mathematics, Second Series, 176 (1): 151–219, doi:10.4007/annals.2012.176.1.2, MR 2925382
