= Paul Erdős Prize =

The Paul Erdős Prize (formerly Mathematical Prize) is given to Hungarian mathematicians not older than 40 by the Mathematics Department of the Hungarian Academy of Sciences. It was established and originally funded by Paul Erdős.

== Awardees ==
- 1976: István Juhász
- 1977: Gábor Halász
- 1978: Endre Szemerédi
- 1979: László Lovász
- 1980: Ferenc Schipp
- 1981: Zoltán Daróczy
- 1982: Gábor Tusnády
- 1983: András Sárközy
- 1984: László Babai
- 1985: Ferenc Móricz
- 1986: József Beck
- 1987: János Pintz
- 1988: Sándor Csörgő
- 1989: Miklós Laczkovich
- 1990: Imre Ruzsa
- 1991: Péter Komjáth
- 1992: Ágnes Szendrei
- 1993: Antal Balog
- 1994: Péter Pál Pálfy
- 1995: Bálint Tóth
- 1996: Imre Bárány
- 1997: László Pyber
- 1998: Tamás Szőnyi
- 1999: Lajos Soukup
- 2000: Lajos Molnár, Gábor Tardos
- 2001: Géza Makay
- 2002: Gyula Károlyi
- 2003: András Bíró
- 2004: Károly Böröczky Jun.
- 2005: Ákos Pintér
- 2006: Mátyás Domokos
- 2007: Tibor Jordán
- 2008: Géza Tóth
- 2009: Márton Elekes
- 2010: Miklós Abért
- 2011: Katalin Gyarmati
- 2012: Balázs Márton
- 2013: Balázs Szegedy
- 2014: Gábor Pete
- 2015: Péter Varjú
- 2016: Attila Maróti
- 2017: Gábor Kun
- 2018: Endre Csóka

== See also ==
- List of mathematics awards

== Sources ==
The list on the homepage of the Hungarian academy
