= Gyula Katona =

Gyula Katona may refer to:

- Gyula O. H. Katona, Hungarian mathematician and father of Gyula Y. Katona
- Gyula Y. Katona, Hungarian mathematician and son of Gyula O. H. Katona
- Gyula Katona (gymnast), who competed for Hungary in the 1900 Olympics
