= Yoshiko Wakabayashi =

Brazilian computer scientist and applied mathematician

- Born: 21 May 1950 (age 76)

Academic background
- Education: University of Augsburg
- Thesis: Aggregation of Binary Relations: Algorithmic and Polyhedral Investigations
- Doctoral advisor: Martin Grötschel

Academic work
- Discipline: computer science applied mathematics
- Institutions: University of São Paulo
- Main interests: combinatorial optimization polyhedral combinatorics packing problems graph algorithms
- Website: http://www.ime.usp.br/~yw

Yoshiko Wakabayashi (born 21 May 1950) is a Brazilian computer scientist and applied mathematician whose research interests include combinatorial optimization, polyhedral combinatorics, packing problems, and graph algorithms. She is a professor in the department of computer science and institute of mathematics and statistics at the University of São Paulo.

== Education and career ==
After earning bachelor's and master's degrees in applied mathematics at the University of São Paulo in 1972 and 1977 respectively, Wakabayashi went to the University of Augsburg in Germany for doctoral study in applied mathematics, completing her doctorate (Dr. rer. nat.) in 1986. Her dissertation, Aggregation of Binary Relations: Algorithmic and Polyhedral Investigations, was supervised by Martin Grötschel.

She became an assistant professor at the University of São Paulo in 1977, associate professor in 1995, and full professor in 2006.

== Recognition ==
Wakabayashi was named as a commander of the National Order of Scientific Merit in 2010. She was elected to the Academia de Ciências do Estado de São Paulo in 2012, and to the Brazilian Academy of Sciences in 2019.

In 2020 the Brazilian Computer Society gave her their prize for scientific merit.
