= Imre Bárány =

Hungarian mathematician

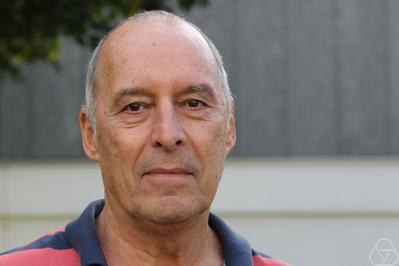
Imre Bárány in 2011

Imre Bárány (Mátyásföld, Budapest, 7 December 1947) is a Hungarian mathematician, working in combinatorics and discrete geometry. He works at the Rényi Mathematical Institute of the Hungarian Academy of Sciences, and has a part-time appointment at University College London.

== Notable results ==
- He gave a surprisingly simple alternative proof of László Lovász's theorem on Kneser graphs.
- He gave a new proof of the Borsuk–Ulam theorem.
- Bárány gave a colored version of Carathéodory's theorem.
- He solved an old problem of James Joseph Sylvester on the probability of random point sets in convex position.
- With Van H. Vu proved a central limit theorem on random points in convex bodies.
- With Zoltán Füredi he gave an algorithm for mental poker.
- With Füredi he proved that no deterministic polynomial time algorithm determines the volume of convex bodies in dimension d within a multiplicative error d^{d}.
- With Füredi and János Pach he proved the following six circle conjecture of László Fejes Tóth: if in a planar circle packing each circle is tangent to at least 6 other circles, then either it is the hexagonal system of circles with identical radii, or there are circles with arbitrarily small radius.

== Career ==
Bárány received the Mathematical Prize (now Paul Erdős Prize) of the Hungarian Academy of Sciences in 1985. He was an invited speaker at the Combinatorics session of the International Congress of Mathematicians, in Beijing, 2002. He was an Erdős Lecturer at Hebrew University of Jerusalem in 2004. He was elected a corresponding (2010), full (2016) member of the Hungarian Academy of Sciences. In 2012 he became a fellow of the American Mathematical Society. Since 2021, he is a member of the Academia Europaea.

He is an editor-in-chief for the journal Combinatorica, and an Editorial Board member for Mathematika and the Online Journal of Analytic Combinatorics. He is area editor of the journal Mathematics of Operations Research.
