= Ágnes Szendrei =

Hungarian-American mathematician

Ágnes Szendrei is a Hungarian-American mathematician whose research concerns clones, the congruence lattice problem, and other topics in universal algebra. She is a professor of mathematics at the University of Colorado Boulder, and the author of the well-cited book Clones in Universal Algebra (1986). In May 2022, Dr. Szendrei was elected as an external member of the Hungarian Academy of Sciences; such external memberships are for Hungarian scientists who live outside of Hungary and who have made exceptional contributions to scientific research.

Szendrei earned a doctorate from the Hungarian Academy of Sciences in 1982, and a habilitation in 1993. Her 1982 dissertation was Clones of Linear Operations and Semi-Affine Algebras, supervised by Béla Csákány. She was on the faculty of the University of Szeged from 1982 until 2003, when she moved to the University of Colorado.

Szendrei is a Humboldt Fellow. She won the Kató Rényi Award for undergraduate research in 1975, the Géza Grünwald Commemorative Prize for young researchers of the János Bolyai Mathematical Society in 1978, and the Golden Ring of the Republic in 1979. She was the 1992 winner of the Paul Erdős Prize of the Hungarian Academy of Sciences, and the 2000 winner of the Academy's Farkas Bolyai Award.
