= Van H. Vu =

Vietnamese mathematician

- Born: June 12, 1970 (age 56); Hanoi, Vietnam
- Education: Eötvös Loránd University, Yale University
- Organization(s): University of Hong Kong; Rutgers University; University of California, San Diego; Microsoft Research; Institute for Advanced Study

Van H. Vu (Vietnamese: Vũ Hà Văn) is a Vietnamese mathematician and a Professor of Mathematics at the University of Hong Kong. He was previously the Percey F. Smith Professor of Mathematics at Yale University.

== Education and career ==
Vu was born in Hanoi (Vietnam) in 1970. He went to special math classes for gifted children at Chu Van An and Hanoi-Amsterdam high schools. In 1987, he went to Hungary for his undergraduate studies, and in 1994, obtained his M.Sc in mathematics at the Faculty of Sciences of the Eötvös University, Budapest. His thesis supervisor was Tamás Szőnyi. He received his Ph.D. at Yale University in 1998 under the direction of László Lovász. He worked as a postdoc at IAS and Microsoft Research (1998-2001). He joined the University of California, San Diego as an assistant professor in 2001 and was promoted to full professor in 2005. In Fall 2005, he moved to Rutgers University and stayed there until he joined Yale in Fall 2011. Vu was a member at IAS on three occasions (1998, 2005, 2007), the last time, in 2007, as the leader of the special program Arithmetic Combinatorics.

== Contributions ==
In his PhD thesis, Vu, together with Kim, developed a theory for concentration of measure of polynomials (and non-Lipschitz functions in general). Later, as an application, he established a refinement of Waring's problem.

In 2003, Vu and Szemerédi solved the Erdős-Folkman problem, answering the following question: How dense a set of positive integers should be so every sufficiently large integer can be represented as a subsum?

In 2006, with Tao and Vu published their book "Additive Combinatorics". Together, they developed the Inverse Littlewood-Offord theory for anti-concentration.

In 2007, with Johansson and Kahn, Vu solved the Shamir conjecture in random graph theory. Among others, they established the sharp threshold for the existence of a perfect matching in a random hypergraph.

In 2010, Terence Tao and Vu solved the circular law conjecture in random matrix theory, which established the non-Hermitian version of Wigner semi-circle law.

In 2011, they proved the "four moment" theorem, establishing universality of local law of eigenvalues of random matrices. Similar results were obtained around the same time by László Erdős, Horng-Tzer Yau, and Jun Yin.

== Awards and honors ==
As a junior researcher, Vu was a recipient of an NSF Career Award and a Sloan fellowship.

In 2008 he was awarded the Pólya Prize of the Society for Industrial and Applied Mathematics for his work on concentration of measure.

In 2012, Vu was awarded the Fulkerson Prize (jointly with Anders Johansson and Jeff Kahn) for the solution of Shamir problem. Also in 2012, he became a fellow of the American Mathematical Society. In the same year, he was a Medallion lecturer at the 8th World congress in Probability and Statistics, Istanbul.

In 2014, he was an invited speaker at the ICM (Seoul). In 2020, he became a fellow of the Institute of Mathematical Statistics.

By Mathscinet statistics (as in 2022), he ranks third among the most cited mathematicians with PhD in 1998 (behind E. Candes and C. Villani) https://mathcitations.github.io/
