= Széchenyi Prize =

Hungarian academic award

The Széchenyi Prize (Hungarian: Széchenyi-díj), named after István Széchenyi, is a prize given in Hungary by the state, replacing the former State Prize in 1990 in recognition of those who have made an outstanding contribution to academic life in Hungary. It is awarded annually on the 15th of March, in commemoration of the Hungarian Revolution of 1848.

== Recipients ==
- Alex Szalay – 1991
- Erik Fügedi – 1992
- Cseh-Szombathy László, ifj. – 1994
- János Kornai – 1994
- Ágnes Heller – 1995
- Vera T. Sós – 1997
- György Enyedi – 1998
- Miklós Laczkovich – 1998
- István Nász – 1998
- Thomas Molnar – 2000
- Gyula O. H. Katona – 2005
- László Gallé – 2007
- Katalin Keserü – 2007
- Mihály Simai – 2007
- András Szőllősy – 2007
- László Lovász – 2008
- Erika Kálmán – 2008
- András Jánossy – 2009
- Botond Penke – 2009
- Mária Augusztinovics – 2010
- András Sárközy – 2010
- Ferenc Friedler – 2010
- György Horvai – 2010
- Mihaly Csikszentmihalyi – 2011
- László Lénárd – 2011
- Lajos Pósa – 2011
- Gábor Stépán – 2011
- György Inzelt – 2011
- George Andrew Olah – 2011 – Grand Prix
- Endre Szemerédi – 2012
- György Kéri – 2013
- Eösze László – 2013
- Telegdy Gyula – 2014
- Mária Schmidt, Miklós Simonovits – 2014
- Péter Erdő, Miklós Maróth – 2016
- Béla Bollobás – 2017
- Katalin Karikó – 2021
- András Perczel – 2021
- György Bagdy – 2022
