= György Kéri =

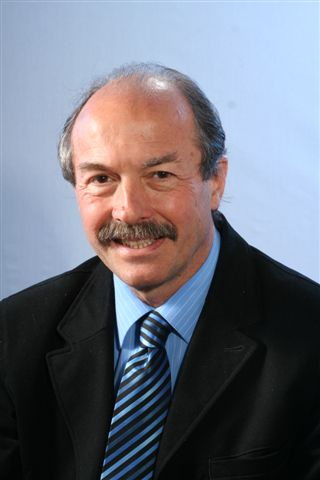
- Kéri in 2007
- Born: January 11, 1950; Budapest, Hungary
- Died: July 20, 2016 (aged 66); Budapest
- Education: Eötvös Loránd University
- Scientific career
- Fields: Biochemistry, Signal transduction therapy
- Workplaces: University of California, San Francisco; Semmelweis University; Hungarian Academy of Sciences; Vichem

György Kéri (Hungarian: [ˈɟørɟ ˈkeːri]; January 11, 1950 – July 20, 2016) was a Hungarian biochemist, professor and Doctor of Biological Sciences (D.Sc.). His major field of research was signal transduction therapy, and he participated in the development of novel drug discovery technologies and drug candidates that entered the clinical development process.

== Education ==
He studied chemistry at the Eötvös Loránd University (Budapest), where he graduated in 1973 and received a PhD in biochemistry in 1976. He worked as a postdoctoral research fellow at the University of California, San Francisco in 1978-1979.

== Career ==
As a visiting scientist, he returned to the United States 19 times for various time periods on the basis of a National Science Foundation grant and joint research programs with University of California, San Francisco and Sugen. From the Hungarian Academy of Sciences, he received Candidatus of Biological Sciences (C.Sc.) in 1982 and Doctor of Biological Sciences (D.Sc.) in 1994. In 1997, he became Dr. Med. Habil. of the Semmelweis University. He was married to Mária Kenéz, and has two children (Csaba 1976 and Júlia 1980) and a granddaughter Luca (2008).

== History ==
- 1979-1988: Research scientist and Senior research scientist of First Institute of Biochemistry, Semmelweis University Medical School and Hungarian Academy of Sciences
- 1988-1994: Head of Peptide Research Laboratory, Associate Professor of Biochemistry, Joint Research Organization of the Hungarian Academy of Sciences and Semmelweis University Medical School, The First Institute of Biochemistry
- 1994-2008: Head of Peptide Biochemistry Research Group and Rational Drug Design Laboratory, Professor of Biochemistry, Department of Medicinal Chemistry, Semmelweis Medical University
- 1992-1999: Scientific advisor of Sugen
- 1999-2005: Scientific advisor of Axxima Pharmaceuticals
- 1999–present: CEO and CSO of Vichem Chemie Research Ltd.
- 2001-2012: Chairman of Rational Drug Design Laboratories Co-operation Research Center, Semmelweis University
- 2002-2008: Curator of Office for Subsidised Research Units of Hungarian Academy of Sciences
- 2008-2012: Head of Signal Transduction Therapy Laboratory at Semmelweis University
- 2012–present: Head of Pathobiochemistry Research Group of Hungarian Academy of Sciences at Semmelweis University, Department of Medical Chemistry

== Research ==
György Kéri was an internationally recognized expert on signal transduction therapy and personalized therapy. His pioneering work focused on the utilization of signal transduction therapy approach in the pharmaceutical research. He achieved outstanding results in the research and development of peptide hormone derivatives and kinase inhibitors as antitumor agents. He was involved in the development of a signal-inhibiting somatostatin peptide compound (TT-232), which reached Phase II clinical trials, and SU101, which reached Phase III clinical trials.

Vichem – the company he co-founded in 1999 – developed a kinase inhibitor library, and a hit finding technology called Nested Chemical Library™ technology and an allosteric library for inhibiting protein-protein interactions. He has developed at Vichem the DriverHit Library™ for inhibiting the signaling pathways activated by cancer driver genes or mutated tumor suppressor genes.

He also participated with German researchers in the development of a new proteomic technology (Target Fishing technology) which makes it possible to identify unknown targets in the signal transduction network or the interacting enzymes of the metabolome.

Over a hundred international patents or patent applications can be linked to his name, while he is a co-author of more than 250 publications in international scientific journals and several book chapters.

== Membership of scientific organizations ==
- Hungarian Chemical Society
- Hungarian Biochemical Society
- Committee of Peptide Research of Hungarian Academy of Sciences
- Society of Hungarian Oncologists
- Member of the Council of Res.Institutes of Hungarian Academy of Sciences
- European Peptide Society
- American Peptide Society
- International Society of Oncodevelopmental Biology and Medicine
- European Association for Cancer Research
- Executive Committee of EC European Biotechnology Consortium
- President of the Curatorium of the Szekerke Mária Cancer Research Foundation
- Vice President of the European Biotechnology Thematic Network Association (2009–2011)
- Member of the Healthcare Council of EuropaBio

== Editorial board memberships ==
- Current Signal Transduction Therapy (Bentham Sci. Publisher) Editor-in-Chief
- Current Opinion in Molecular Therapeutics (Thomson Reuters)
- Journal of Receptors and Signal Transduction, (Informa Healthcare)
- Endocrine (Springer)
- International Journal of Peptide Research and Therapeutics (Springer)

== Awards ==
- Gold medal awarded inventor of Hungary (1986)
- Award for outstanding research work from Hungarian Academy of Sciences (1988)
- Debio Peptide Award of the 22nd European Peptide Symposium for the development of novel selective antitumor peptide hormones (1992)
- Széchenyi Professorship of the Ministry of Education and Culture (1996)
- Queensland University Research Award (2000)
- "The Academic Award" of the Hungarian Academy of Sciences (2002)
- Jedlik Ányos Award (2008)
- Outstanding Innovation Award of Hungarian Academy Sciences and Hungarian Patent Office (2010)
- Széchenyi Prize (2013)

== Main publications ==
- Photoaffinity labeling of corticotropin receptors (co-author, PNAS (USA) 77: 3967-3970, 1980)
- Comparison of the tyrosine kinase activity with the proliferation rate in human solid tumors and tumor cell lines (co-author, TUMOR BIOLOGY 9: 315-322, 1988)
- Flk1 as a Target for Tumor Growth Inhibition (co-author, CANCER RESEARCH 56: 3540-3345, 1996)
- Tumor-selective somatostatin analog (TT-232) with strong in vitro and in vivo antitumor activity (co-author, PNAS 93: 12513-12518, 1996
- The antitumor somatostatin analogue TT-232 induces cell cycle arrest through PKCdelta and c-Src (co-author, BIOCHEM. BIOPHYS. RES. COM. 285: 483-488, 2001)
- Molecular Pathomechanisms and New Trends in Drug Research (editor and co-author CRC Press Taylor and Frances Group, 2003)
- Drug discovery in the kinase inhibitory field using the Nested Chemical Library (TM) technology (co-author, ASSAY AND DRUG DEVELOPMENT TECHNOLOGIES 3: 543-551, 2005)
- Nuclear translocation of the tumor marker pyruvate kinase M2 induces programmed cell death (co-author, CANCER RESEARCH 67:1602-1608, 2007)
- AXL is a potential target for therapeutic intervention in breast cancer progression (co-author, CANCER RESEARCH 68:1905-1915, 2008)
- Kinase-selective enrichment enables quantitative phosphoproteomics of the kinome across the cell cycle (co-author, MOLECULAR CELL 31:438-448, 2008)
- Proteomics strategy for quantitative protein interaction profiling in cell extracts (co-author, NATURE METHODS 6: 741-744, 2009)
- Integrating molecular diagnostics into anticancer drug discovery (co-author NATURE REVIEWS DRUG DISCOVERY 9:(523-535, 2010)
- Development of a Cell Selective and Intrinsically Active Multikinase Inhibitor Bioconjugate (co-author, BIOCONJUGATE CHEMISTRY 22:540-545,2011)
- Interaction of the EGFR inhibitors gefitinib, vandetanib, pelitinib and neratinib with the ABCG2 multidrug transporter: Implications for the emergence and reversal of cancer drug resistance BIOCHEMICAL PHARMACOLOGY 84: 260-267, 2012
- Developing FGFR4 inhibitors as potential anticancer agents via in silico design, supported by in vitro and cellbased (co-author CURRENT MEDICINAL CHEMISTRY 20:1203-1217, 2013

== Sources ==
- Adatlap a Magyar Tudományos Akadémia honlapján részletes publikációs listával
- Szakmai életrajz a drugdesign.hu-n
- Szakmai életrajz a vichem.hu-n
- Gábor Dénes-díjasok Klubjának honlapja
- Semmelweis Hírek: Dr. Kéri György akadémiai kutatócsoportja
- Novofer Alapítvány: Dr. Kéri György
- Magyar Tudomány, 2004/1 70. o.
