= Mária Augusztinovics =

Hungarian economist

Mária Augusztinovics (also Marija Augustinovič or Maria Augustinovics, 1930 – 21 November 2014) was a Hungarian macroeconomist known for her work in labour economics and on pension systems.

Augusztinovics graduated from the Karl Marx University of Economics in Budapest in 1952, defended her doctoral dissertation there in 1956, and completed a habilitation in 1980. In 1979, as Head of department in the Hungarian National Planning Office, Augusztinovics was elected as a Fellow of the Econometric Society. She was given the József Eötvös laureate in 2000, the prize of the János Arany Public Foundation for Science in 2002, the Officer's Cross of the Hungarian Order of Merit in 2008, and the Széchenyi Prize in 2010. She was also a consulting member of the Hungarian Academy of Sciences and an honorary professor at Corvinus University of Budapest.
