= Peter Szüsz =

Hungarian-American Jewish Mathematician

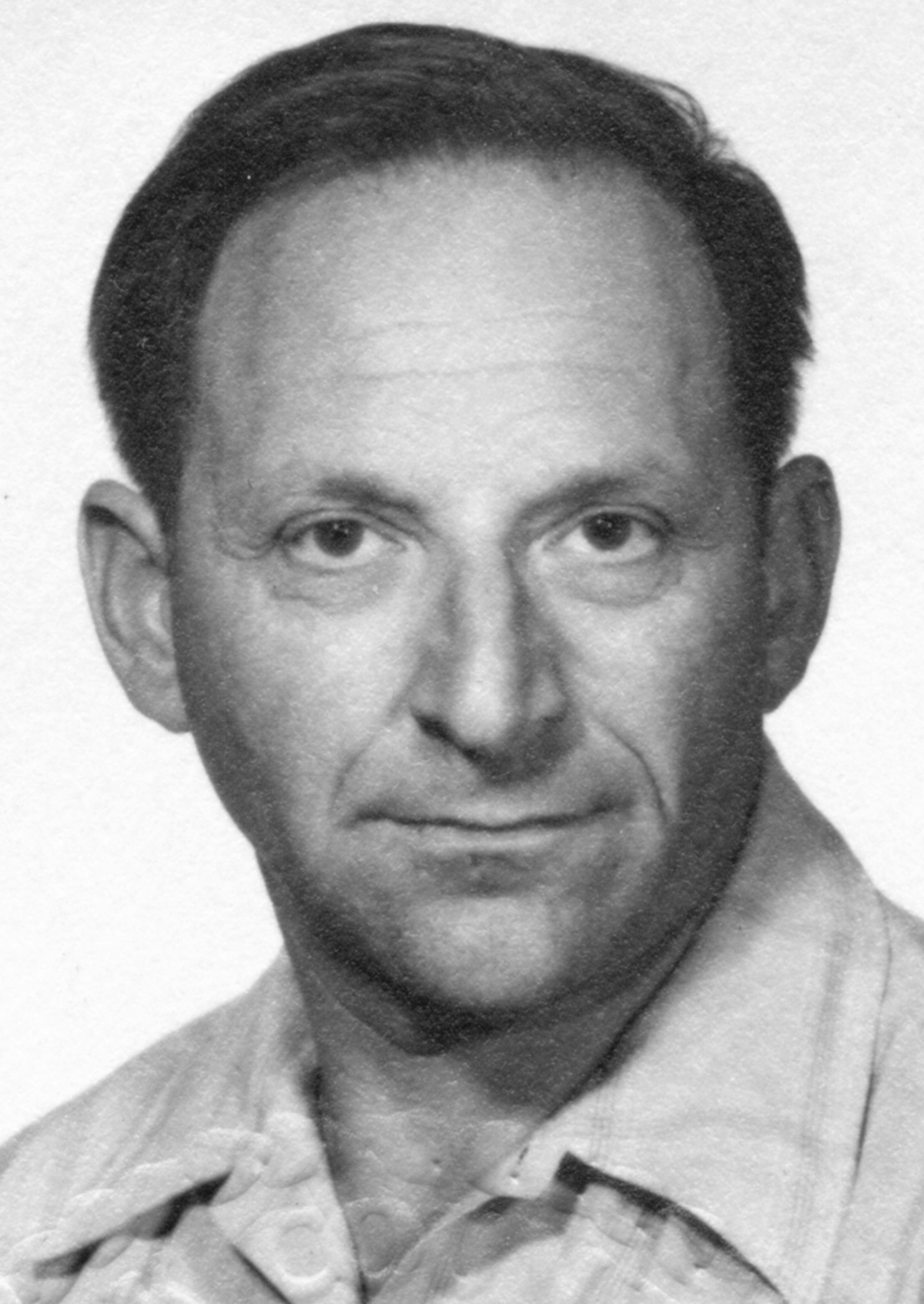
Peter Szüsz (1974)

Peter Szüsz (11 November 1924 – 16 February 2008) was a Serbian-Hungarian-American mathematician known for his proof (1961) of the Gauss-Kuzmin Theorem, his work in probabilistic number theory, and his book with Andrew M. Rockett on Continued Fractions.

== Early life ==
Born in Novi Sad, Serbia, he grew up in Budapest, Hungary, attending the Eötvös József Gimnázium and beginning his life-long passions for chess, music, and mathematics. He was the son of Irma (née Oberson) and Felix Szusz. He had one brother, Adam (Allen Saunders). In 1944 he was drafted into forced labour service and sent to the Heidenau Lager at the copper mines near Bor, but escaped from the Nazi SS death march to Cservenka and was hidden by the Gyulai family near Kula until the end of the war.

== Career ==
After studying first electrical engineering and then mathematics at the University of Budapest, he became a Research Fellow at the Hungarian Academy of Science from 1950 to 1965, received his Ph.D. as a student of Pál Turán in 1951, and became a Doctor of Science at the Academy in 1962. He fled communist Hungary in 1965, became a Full Professor of Mathematics at the State University of New York at Stony Brook (now Stony Brook University) in 1966 and retired in 1994.
