= András Frank =

Hungarian mathematician

- Born: 3 June 1949 (age 77); Budapest
- Education: University of Szeged
- Scientific career
- Fields: Mathematics
- Workplaces: Eötvös Loránd University
- Doctoral advisor: László Lovász
- Doctoral students: András Sebő; Éva Tardos

András Frank (born 3 June 1949) is a Hungarian mathematician, working in combinatorics, especially in graph theory, and combinatorial optimisation. He is director of the Institute of Mathematics of the Faculty of Sciences of the Eötvös Loránd University, Budapest.

== Mathematical work ==
Using the LLL-algorithm, Frank, and his student, Éva Tardos developed a general method, which could transform some polynomial-time algorithms into strong polynomial. He solved the problem of finding the minimum number of edges to be added to a given undirected graph so that in the resulting graph the edge-connectivity between any two vertices u and v is at least a predetermined number f(u,v).

== Degrees, awards ==
He received the Candidate of Mathematical Science degree in 1980, advisor: László Lovász, and the Doctor of Mathematical Science degree (1990) from the Hungarian Academy of Sciences. In 1998 he was an Invited Speaker of the International Congress of Mathematicians in Berlin. He was awarded the Tibor Szele Prize of the János Bolyai Mathematical Society in 2002 and the Albert Szent-Györgyi Prize in 2009. In June 2009 the ELTE Mathematical Institute sponsored a workshop in honor of his 60th birthday. He is a member of the Hungarian Academy of Sciences (corresponding member since 2016, full member since 2022).
