= Blocking set =

Concept in projective geometry

In geometry, specifically projective geometry, a blocking set is a set of points in a projective plane that every line intersects and that does not contain an entire line. The concept can be generalized in several ways. Instead of talking about points and lines, one could deal with n-dimensional subspaces and m-dimensional subspaces, or even more generally, objects of type 1 and objects of type 2 when some concept of intersection makes sense for these objects. A second way to generalize would be to move into more abstract settings than projective geometry. One can define a blocking set of a hypergraph as a set that meets all edges of the hypergraph.

== Definition ==
In a finite projective plane π of order n, a blocking set is a set of points of π that every line intersects and that contains no line completely. Under this definition, if B is a blocking set, then complementary set of points, π\B is also a blocking set. A blocking set B is minimal if the removal of any point of B leaves a set which is not a blocking set. A blocking set of smallest size is called a committee. Every committee is a minimal blocking set, but not all minimal blocking sets are committees. Blocking sets exist in all projective planes except for the smallest projective plane of order 2, the Fano plane.

It is sometimes useful to drop the condition that a blocking set does not contain a line. Under this extended definition, and since, in a projective plane every pair of lines meet, every line would be a blocking set. Blocking sets which contained lines would be called trivial blocking sets, in this setting.

== Examples ==
In any projective plane of order n (each line contains n + 1 points), the points on the lines forming a triangle without the vertices of the triangle (3(n - 1) points) form a minimal blocking set (if n = 2 this blocking set is trivial) which in general is not a committee.

Another general construction in an arbitrary projective plane of order n is to take all except one point, say P, on a given line and then one point on each of the other lines through P, making sure that these points are not all collinear (this last condition can not be satisfied if n = 2.) This produces a minimal blocking set of size 2n.

A projective triangle β of side m in PG(2,q) consists of 3(m - 1) points, m on each side of a triangle, such that the vertices A, B and C of the triangle are in β, and the following condition is satisfied: If point P on line AB and point Q on line BC are both in β, then the point of intersection of PQ and AC is in β.

A projective triad δ of side m is a set of 3m - 2 points, m of which lie on each of three concurrent lines such that the point of concurrency C is in δ and the following condition is satisfied: If a point P on one of the lines and a point Q on another line are in δ, then the point of intersection of PQ with the third line is in δ.

Theorem: In PG(2,q) with q odd, there exists a projective triangle of side (q + 3)/2 which is a blocking set of size 3(q + 1)/2.

Using homogeneous coordinates, let the vertices of the triangle be A = (1,0,0), B = (0,1,0) and C = (0,0,1). The points, other than the vertices, on side AB have coordinates of the form (-c, 1, 0), those on BC have coordinates (0,1,a) and those on AC have coordinates (1,0,b) where a, b and c are elements of the finite field GF(q). Three points, one on each of these sides, are collinear if and only if a = bc. By choosing all of the points where a, b and c are nonzero squares of GF(q), the condition in the definition of a projective triangle is satisfied.

Theorem: In PG(2,q) with q even, there exists a projective triad of side (q + 2)/2 which is a blocking set of size (3q + 2)/2.

The construction is similar to the above, but since the field is of characteristic 2, squares and non-squares need to be replaced by elements of absolute trace 0 and absolute trace 1. Specifically, let C = (0,0,1). Points on the line X = 0 have coordinates of the form (0,1,a), and those on the line Y = 0 have coordinates of the form (1,0,b). Points of the line X = Y have coordinates which may be written as (1,1,c). Three points, one from each of these lines, are collinear if and only if a = b + c. By selecting all the points on these lines where a, b and c are the field elements with absolute trace 0, the condition in the definition of a projective triad is satisfied.

Theorem: In PG(2,p), with p a prime, there exists a projective triad of side (p + 1)/2 which is a blocking set of size (3p+ 1)/2.

== Size ==
One typically searches for small blocking sets. The minimum size of a blocking set of $H$ is called $\tau(H)$.

In the Desarguesian projective plane of order q, PG(2,q), the size of a blocking set B is bounded:

$$q + \sqrt{q} + 1 \leq |B| \leq q^2 - \sqrt{q}.$$

When q is a square the lower bound is achieved by any Baer subplane and the upper bound comes from the complement of a Baer subplane.

A more general result can be proved,

Any blocking set in a projective plane π of order n has at least $n + \sqrt{n} + 1$ points. Moreover, if this lower bound is met, then n is necessarily a square and the blocking set consists of the points in some Baer subplane of π.

An upper bound for the size of a minimal blocking set has the same flavor,

Any minimal blocking set in a projective plane π of order n has at most $n \sqrt{n} + 1$ points. Moreover, if this upper bound is reached, then n is necessarily a square and the blocking set consists of the points of some unital embedded in π.

When n is not a square less can be said about the smallest sized nontrivial blocking sets. One well known result due to Aart Blokhuis is:

Theorem: A nontrivial blocking set in PG(2,p), p a prime, has size at least 3(p + 1)/2.

In these planes a projective triangle which meets this bound exists.

== History ==
Blocking sets originated in the context of economic game theory in a 1956 paper by Moses Richardson. Players were identified with points in a finite projective plane and minimal winning coalitions were lines. A blocking coalition was defined as a set of points containing no line but intersecting every line. In 1958, J. R. Isbell studied these games from a non-geometric viewpoint. Jane W. DiPaola studied the minimum blocking coalitions in all the projective planes of order $\leq 9$ in 1969.

== In hypergraphs ==
Let $H = (X,E)$ be a hypergraph, so that $X$ is a set of elements, and $E$ is a collection of subsets of $X$, called (hyper)edges. A blocking set of $H$ is a subset $S$ of $X$ that has nonempty intersection with each hyperedge.

Blocking sets are sometimes also called "hitting sets" or "vertex covers". Also the term "transversal" is used, but in some contexts a transversal of $H$ is a subset $T$ of $X$ that meets each hyperedge in exactly one point.

A "two-coloring" of $H$ is a partition $\{C,D\}$ of $X$ into two subsets (color classes) such that no edge is monochromatic, i.e., no edge is contained entirely within $C$ or within $D$. Now both $C$ and $D$ are blocking sets.

== Complete k-arcs ==
In a projective plane a complete k-arc is a set of k points, no three collinear, which can not be extended to a larger arc (thus, every point not on the arc is on a secant line of the arc–a line meeting the arc in two points.)

Theorem: Let K be a complete k-arc in Π = PG(2,q) with k < q + 2. The dual in Π of the set of secant lines of K is a blocking set, B, of size k(k - 1)/2.

== Rédei blocking sets ==
In any projective plane of order q, for any nontrivial blocking set B (with b = |B|, the size of the blocking set) consider a line meeting B in n points. Since no line is contained in B, there must be a point, P, on this line which is not in B. The q other lines though P must each contain at least one point of B in order to be blocked. Thus, $b \geq n + q.$ If for some line equality holds in this relation, the blocking set is called a blocking set of Rédei type and the line a Rédei line of the blocking set (note that n will be the largest number of collinear points in B). Not all blocking sets are of Rédei type, but many of the smaller ones are. These sets are named after László Rédei whose monograph on Lacunary polynomials over finite fields was influential in the study of these sets.

== Affine blocking sets ==
A set of points in the finite Desarguesian affine space $AG(n,q)$ that intersects every hyperplane non-trivially, i.e., every hyperplane is incident with some point of the set, is called an affine blocking set. Identify the space with $\mathbb{F}_q^n$ by fixing a coordinate system. Then it is easily shown that the set of points lying on the coordinate axes form a blocking set of size $1 + n(q-1)$. Jean Doyen conjectured in a 1976 Oberwolfach conference that this is the least possible size of a blocking set. This was proved by R. E. Jamison in 1977, and independently by A. E. Brouwer, A. Schrijver in 1978 using the so-called polynomial method. Jamison proved the following general covering result from which the bound on affine blocking sets follows using duality:

Let $V$ be an $n$ dimensional vector space over $\mathbb{F}_q$. Then the number of $k$-dimensional cosets required to cover all vectors except the zero vector is at least $q^{n-k} - 1 + k(q-1)$. Moreover, this bound is sharp.
