= László Rédei =

Hungarian mathematician

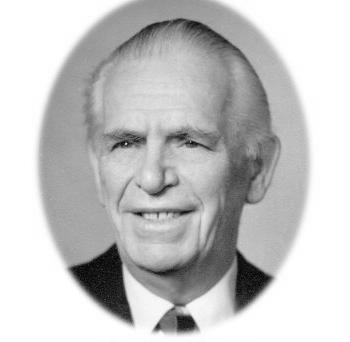
- Portrait of László Rédei
- Born: 15 November 1900; Rákoskeresztúr, Austria-Hungary
- Died: 21 November 1980 (aged 80); Budapest, Hungary
- Scientific career
- Fields: Mathematics

László Rédei (15 November 1900 – 21 November 1980) was a Hungarian mathematician.

Rédei graduated from the University of Budapest and initially worked as a schoolteacher. In 1940 he was appointed professor in the University of Szeged and in 1967 moved to the Mathematical Institute of the Hungarian Academy of Sciences in Budapest.

His mathematical work was in algebraic number theory and abstract algebra, especially group theory. He proved that every finite tournament contains an odd number of Hamiltonian paths. He gave several proofs of the theorem on quadratic reciprocity. He proved important results concerning the invariants of the class groups of quadratic number fields. In several cases, he determined if the ring of integers of the real quadratic field Q(√d) is Euclidean or not. He successfully generalized Hajós's theorem. This led him to the investigations of lacunary polynomials over finite fields, which he eventually published in a book. This work on lacunary polynomials has had a big influence in the field of finite geometry where it plays an important role in the theory of blocking sets. He introduced a very general notion of skew product of groups, of which both the Schreier-extension and the Zappa–Szép product are special case. He explicitly determined those finite noncommutative groups whose all proper subgroups were commutative (1947). This is one of the very early results which eventually led to the classification of all finite simple groups.

Rédei was the president of the János Bolyai Mathematical Society (1947–1949). He was awarded the Kossuth Prize twice. He was elected corresponding member (1949), full member (1955) of the Hungarian Academy of Sciences.

== Books ==
- 1959: Algebra. Erster Teil, Mathematik und ihre Anwendungen in Physik und Technik, Reihe A, 26, Teil 1 Akademische Verlagsgesellschaft, Geest & Portig, K.-G., Leipzig, xv+797 pp.
- 1967: English translation, Algebra, volume 1, Pergamon Press
- 1963: Theorie der endlich erzeugbaren kommutativen Halbgruppen, Hamburger Mathematische Einzelschriften, 41, Physica-Verlag, Würzburg 228 pp.
- 1968: Foundation of Euclidean and non-Euclidean geometries according to F. Klein, Pergamon Press, 404 pp.
- 1970: Lückenhafte Polynome über endlichen Körpern, Lehrbücher und Monographien aus dem Gebiete der exakten Wissenschaften, Mathematische Reihe, 42, Birkhäuser Verlag, Basel-Stuttgart, 271 pp.
- 1973: English translation: I. Földes: Lacunary Polynomials over Finite Fields North--Holland, London and Amsterdam, American Elsevier, New York, ISBN 0-7204-2050-4 (Europe) ISBN 0-444-10400-3 (US)
- 1989: Endliche p-Gruppen, Akadémiai Kiadó, Budapest, 304 pp. ISBN 963-05-4660-4
