= Miklós Simonovits =

Hungarian mathematician (born 1943)

- Born: 4 September 1943 (age 82); Budapest
- Education: PhD. Eötvös Loránd University, 1971
- Occupation: Mathematician
- Organization(s): Alfréd Rényi Institute of Mathematics, Budapest
- Known for: Extremal Graph Theory Extremal Combinatorics
- Awards: Szele Tibor-emlékérem (1989) Akadémiai Díj (1993) Széchenyi Prize (2014)
- Website: http://www.renyi.hu/~miki/

Miklós Simonovits (4 September 1943 in Budapest) is a Hungarian mathematician who currently works at the Rényi Institute of Mathematics in Budapest and is a member of the Hungarian Academy of Sciences. He is on the advisory board of the journal Combinatorica. He is best known for his work in extremal graph theory and was awarded Széchenyi Prize in 2014. Among other things, he discovered the method of progressive induction which he used to describe graphs which do not contain a predetermined graph and the number of edges is close to maximal. With Lovász, he gave a randomized algorithm using O(n^{7} log^{2} n) separation calls to approximate the volume of a convex body within a fixed relative error.

Simonovits was also one of the most frequent collaborators with Paul Erdős, co-authoring 21 papers with him.

== Career ==
He began his university studies at the Mathematics department of Eötvös Loránd University in 1962, after winning a silver and bronze medal at the International Mathematics Olympiad in 1961 and 1962 respectively. He got his diploma in mathematics from the university in 1967 and defended his PhD under Vera T. Sós in 1971. He taught as an assistant professor and then associate professor at Eötvös Loránd, from 1971 to 1979, mainly combinatorics and analysis. He joined Alfréd Rényi Institute of Mathematics in 1979. In the coming years, he was appointed as the professor in Discrete mathematics. He was also a visiting professor at a number of foreign institutions in US and Canada. He was also a visiting researcher at Moscow State University, Charles University, Prague, Warsaw University, Denmark and various institutions in India. He was elected as a corresponding member at the Hungarian Academy of Sciences in 2001 and full membership was awarded in 2008.

== Academic work ==
His main research interests are Combinatorics, Extremal Graph Theory, Theoretical Computer Science and Random Graphs.

He discovered the method of progressive induction which he used to describe graphs which do not contain a predetermined graph and the number of edges is close to maximal. With Laszlo Lovász, he gave a randomized algorithm using O(n^{7} log^{2} n) separation calls to approximate the volume of a convex body within a fixed relative error.

He is a long-time collaborator of Endre Szemerédi and worked with him closely.

Simonovits was also one of the most frequent collaborators with Paul Erdős, co-authoring 21 papers with him.

== Family ==
His father Simonovits István (1907–1985) was a doctor and a hematologist. He was a member of the Hungarian Academy of Sciences. Beke Anna, his mother, was a mathematics and physics teacher, who also worked in a book publishing company.

== Awards ==
- Tibor Szele-Medal (1989)
- Academy Award (1993)
- Széchenyi-Prize (2014)

== Key publications ==
- A limit theorem in graph theory (with Erdős Pál, 1966)
- Anti-Ramsey theorems (coauthor, 1973)
- On the Structure of Edge Graphs-2 (coauthor, 1976)
- Spanning Retracts of a Partially Ordered Set (coauthor, 1980)
- Compactness Results in Extremal Graph-Theory (with Erdős Pál, 1982)
- Supersaturated Graphs and Hypergraphs (with Erdős Pál, 1983)
- On Restricted Colorings of K_n (with T. Sós Vera, 1984)
- Szemerédi Partition And Quasi-Randomness (with T. Sós Vera, 1991)
- Random Walks in a Convex Body and an Improved Volume Algorithm (with Lovász László, 1993)
- Isoperimetric Problems for Convex Bodies and a Localization Lemma (coauthor, 1995)
- Szemerédi's Regularity Lemma and its Applications in Graph Theory (with Komlós János, 1996)
- The Regularity Lemma and its applications in graph theory (coauthor, 2002)
- Determinisztikus és véletlen struktúrák az extrém gráfelméletben (Deterministic and random structures in extreme graph-theory) (2002)
- Triple Systems not Containing a Fano Configuration (with Füredi Zoltán, 2005)
- Stabilitási módszerek alkalmazása a gráfelméletben (Application of stability methods in graph-theory) (2008)
