= Zoltán Pál Dienes =

Hungarian mathematician

Zoltán Pál Dienes (Hungarian: [ˈzoltaːn ˈpaːl ˈdijɛnɛʃ]; September 11, 1916 – January 11, 2014), anglicized as Zoltan Paul Dienes, was a Hungarian mathematician whose ideas on education (especially of small children) have been popular in some countries. He was a world-famous theorist and tireless practitioner of the "new mathematics": an approach to mathematics learning that uses games, songs, and dance to make it more appealing to children. He is credited with the creation of base ten blocks, popularly referred to as Dienes blocks.

Dienes's life and ideas are described in his autobiography, Memoirs of a Maverick Mathematician (ISBN 1-84426-192-1), and his book of mathematical games, I Will Tell You Algebra Stories You've Never Heard Before (ISBN 1-84426-191-3). He has also published a book of poetry, Calls from the Past (ISBN 1-84426-190-5).

His later life contributions have been chronicled by Bharath Sriraman in the second monograph of The Montana Mathematics Enthusiast.

== Books ==
His publications include;

- Concept Formation and Personality (1959)
- The Power of Mathematics (1964)
- An Experimental Study of Mathematics Learning (1964)
- Concept Formation and Personality (1965)
- Mathematics in the primary school (1966)
- Geometry Through Transformations: Groups and Coordinates (1967) with Edward William Golding
- Mathematics through the senses, games, dance and art (1973)
- The six stages in the process of learning mathematics (1973)
- Learning Logic Logical Games (1974) with Edward William Golding
- Memoirs of a Maverick Mathematician (1999)
- Calls from the past (2000)
- I Will Tell You Algebra Stories You've Never Heard Before (2003)
- Building Up Mathematics
- Learning Logic, Logical Games with E W Golding
- The six stages in the process of learning mathematics with P L Seaborne
