= György Bagdy =

- Born: 31 July 1955 (age 71)
- Education: Semmelweis University
- Occupations: Pharmacist, academic
- Awards: Diploma of Recognition (1998); Outstanding PhD Lecturer (2009); Tivadar Huzella Memorial Medal (2010); Academic Award (2012); Béla Issekutz Memorial Medal (2014); Ignác Semmelweis Memorial Medal (2021); Széchenyi Prize (2022)

György László Bagdy (born 31 July 1955 in Budapest) is a Hungarian pharmacist, research physician, neuropsychopharmacologist and university professor. He is also a Candidate of Medical Sciences (1992) and Doctor of Sciences at the Hungarian Academy of Sciences (1999).

== Academic career ==
Between 1974 and 1979 Bagdy was a student at the Faculty of Pharmacy of Semmelweis University. Between 1980 and 1983, he qualified as a pharmacologist and toxicologist at the Institute of Postgraduate Medical Education in Budapest. From 1980 to 1986 he was a research assistant at the National Institute of Neurology and Mental Medicine in Budapest. From 1986 to 1990 he was a fellow in the USA, among other things he worked as a research consultant at the National Institute of Mental Health in Bethesda. From 1991 to 1992 he was a research associate at the National Institute of Psychiatry and Neurology, and from 1993 to 2002 he was senior research fellow and head of laboratory, and from 2002 to 2007 he was scientific director. Since 1997 he has been an external lecturer at Eötvös Loránd University. Since 1999, he is Doctor of Sciences at the Hungarian Academy of Sciences. He was appointed a private lecturer at Semmelweis University in 2005. From 2007 to 2008 he was a senior research fellow at the Institute of Pharmacology and Pharmacotherapy at Semmelweis University. From 2008 to 2020, he was Director of the Institute of Pharmacology at Semmelweis University. Since 2010, he has been a professor at Semmelweis University.

His research interests include serotonin physiology and pharmacology.

Bagdy is a member of the European Academy of Sciences and Arts.

== Awards ==
Bagdy was awarded the Diploma of Recognition from the Minister of Health in 1998. In 2009, he was awarded Outstanding PhD Lecturer. In 2010, he won the Tivadar Huzella Memorial Medal and Prize and in 2012 the Academic Award. He received the Béla Issekutz Memorial Medal in 2014, the Ignác Semmelweis Memorial Medal in 2021 and the Széchenyi Prize in 2022.
