= István Nász =

Hungarian bacteriologist (1927–2026)

- Born: 3 March 1927; Túrkeve, Hungary
- Died: 16 June 2026 (aged 99)
- Occupation: Bacteriologist

István Nász (3 March 1927 – 16 June 2026) was a Hungarian bacteriologist. A member of the Hungarian Academy of Sciences, he was a recipient of the Széchenyi Prize (1998).

Nász died on 16 June 2026, at the age of 99.
