= Aquincum Institute of Technology =

Hungarian university program

Coordinates: 47.5608°N 19.0536°E

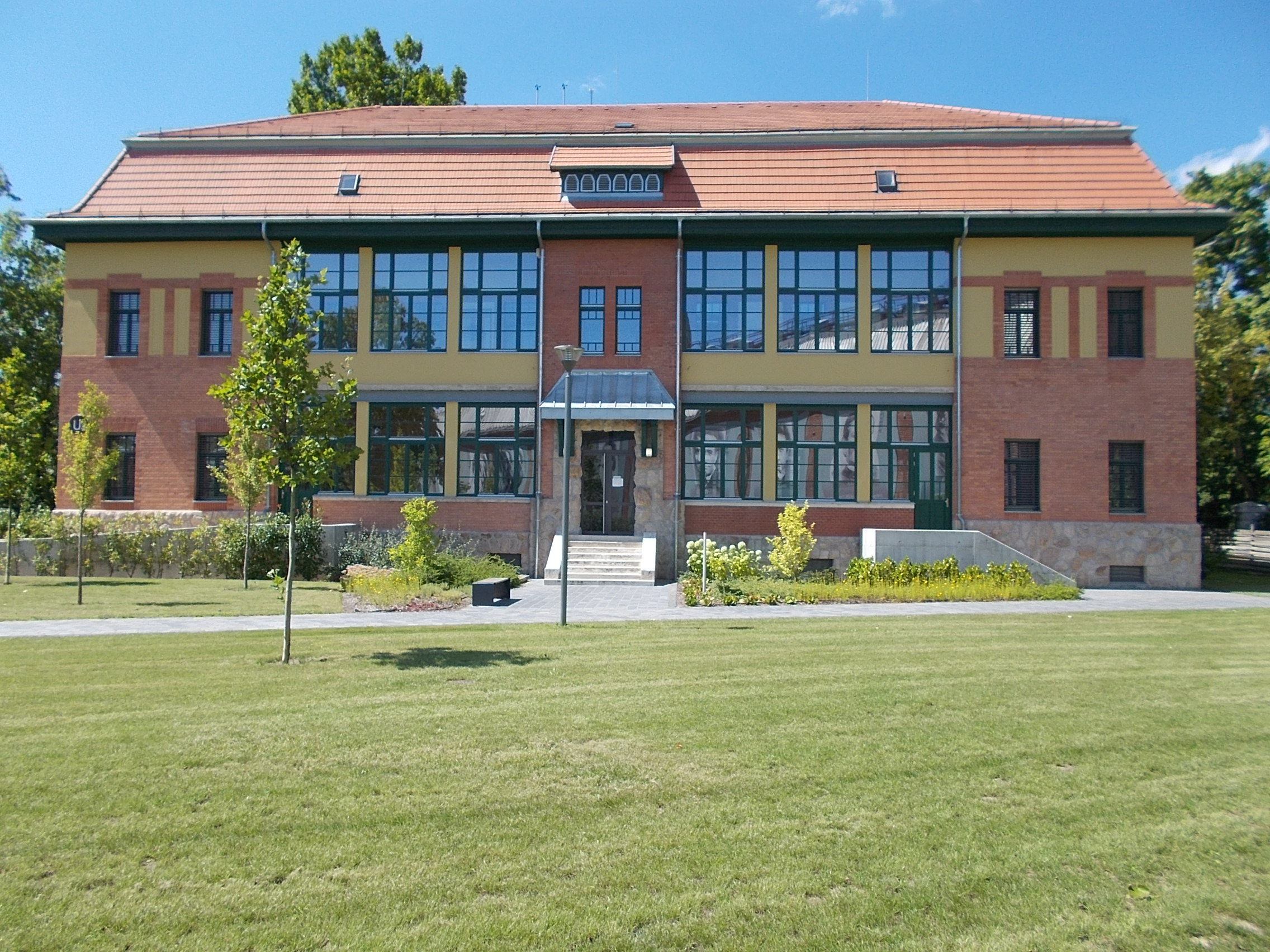

Aquincum Institute of Technology (AIT) is a study abroad opportunity for North American undergraduates in Budapest, Hungary. AIT offers undergraduate programs in computer science, software engineering, and information technology. Established in 2007, the program was created by the businessman Gábor Bojár, founder of Graphisoft. After Bojár sold Graphisoft, he used a majority of the profit from this sale to found AIT in an effort to "Invest in People.". The first official semester was Spring 2011. Each semester, approximately 30-50 North American students study at AIT.

A similar program for mathematics students in Budapest is the Budapest Semesters in Mathematics Program.

== Scientific advisory board ==
- László Babai
- Albert-László Barabási
- Péter Csermely
- András Falus
- Daniel L. Goroff
- Anthony Knerr
- Norbert Kroó
- László Lovász
- Ernő Rubik
- Charles Simonyi
