= László Gallé =

Hungarian biologist (1942–2026)

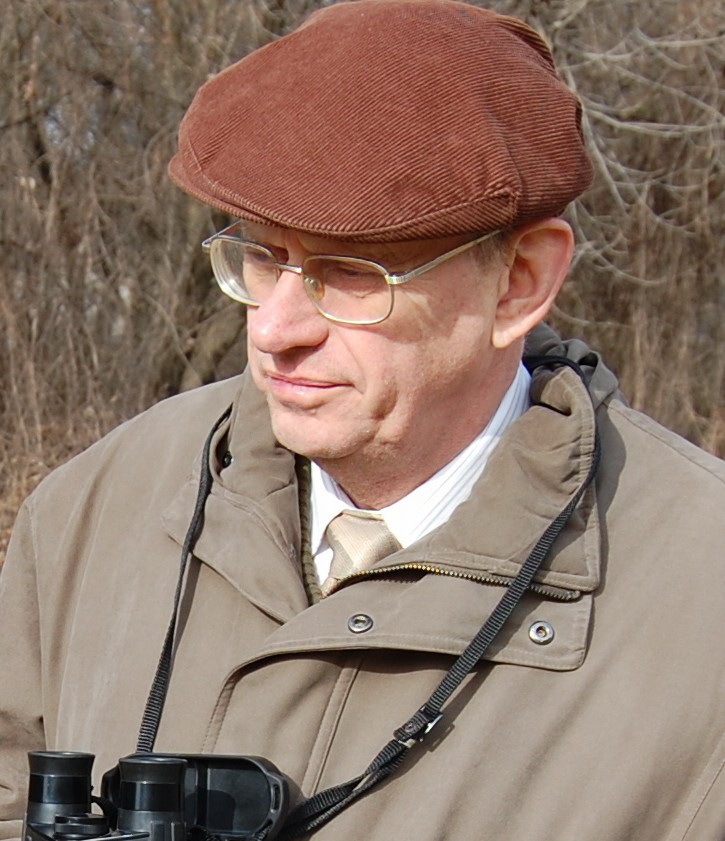
- Gallé in 2012
- Born: 18 November 1942; Szeged, Hungary
- Died: 17 March 2026 (aged 83)
- Education: University of Szeged
- Occupation: Biologist

László Gallé (18 November 1942 – 17 March 2026) was a Hungarian biologist. He was a recipient of the Széchenyi Prize (2007).

Gallé died on 17 March 2026, at the age of 83.
