= György Hajós =

Hungarian mathematician

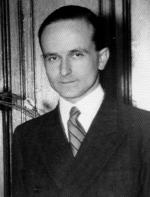
- György Hajós
- Born: 21 February 1912; Budapest, Austria-Hungary
- Died: 17 March 1972; Budapest, Hungary
- Citizenship: Hungarian
- Scientific career
- Fields: Mathematics
- Institutions: University of Budapest, Budapest; Technical University of Budapest, Budapest

György Hajós (February 21, 1912, Budapest – March 17, 1972, Budapest) was a Hungarian mathematician who worked in group theory, graph theory, and geometry.

== Biography ==
Hajós was born February 21, 1912, in Budapest; his great-grandfather, Adam Clark, was the famous Scottish engineer who built the Chain Bridge in Budapest. He earned a teaching degree from the University of Budapest in 1935. He then took a position at the Technical University of Budapest, where he stayed from 1935 to 1949. While at the Technical University of Budapest, he earned a doctorate in 1938. He became a professor at the Eötvös Loránd University in 1949 and remained there until his death in 1972. Additionally he was president of the János Bolyai Mathematical Society from 1963 to 1972.

== Research ==
Hajós's theorem is named after Hajós, and concerns factorizations of Abelian groups into Cartesian products of subsets of their elements. This result in group theory has consequences also in geometry: Hajós used it to prove a conjecture of Hermann Minkowski that, if a Euclidean space of any dimension is tiled by hypercubes whose positions form a lattice, then some pair of hypercubes must meet face-to-face. Hajós used similar group-theoretic methods to attack Keller's conjecture on whether cube tilings (without the lattice constraint) must have pairs of cubes that meet face to face; his work formed an important step in the eventual disproof of this conjecture.

Hajós's conjecture is a conjecture made by Hajós that every graph with chromatic number k contains a subdivision of a complete graph K_{k}. However, it is now known to be false: in 1979, Paul A. Catlin found a counterexample for k = 8, and Paul Erdős and Siemion Fajtlowicz later observed that it fails badly for random graphs. The Hajós construction is a general method for constructing graphs with a given chromatic number, also due to Hajós.

== Awards and honors ==
Hajós was a member of the Hungarian Academy of Sciences, first as a corresponding member beginning in 1948 and then as a full member in 1958. In 1965 he was elected to the Romanian Academy of Sciences, and in 1967 to the German Academy of Sciences Leopoldina. He won the Gyula König Prize in 1942, and the Kossuth Prize in 1951 and again in 1962.
