= Gábor Halász =

Hungarian mathematician

Gábor Halász (born 25 December 1941, in Budapest) is a Hungarian mathematician. He specialised in number theory and mathematical analysis, especially in analytic number theory. He is a member of the Hungarian Academy of Sciences. Since 1985, he is professor at the Faculty of Sciences of the Eötvös Loránd University, Budapest.

With Pál Turán, Halász proved zero density results on the roots of the Riemann zeta function. He co-invented the Halász–Montgomery inequality with Hugh Montgomery.

== Awards, prizes ==
- Alfréd Rényi Prize (1972)
- Paul Erdős Prize (1976)
- Tibor Szele Commemorative Medal of the János Bolyai Mathematical Society (1985)

== Sources ==
- Ki Kicsoda, 2006, MTI, Budapest.
- Halász's homepage at the Hungarian Academy of Sciences.
- A Magyar Tudományos Akadémai Almanachja, Budapest, 2006.
