= Vilmos Totik =

Hungarian mathematician

Vilmos Totik (Mosonmagyaróvár, March 8, 1954) is a Hungarian mathematician, working in classical analysis, harmonic analysis, orthogonal polynomials, approximation theory, potential theory. He is a professor of the University of Szeged. Since 1989 he is also a part-time professor at the University of South Florida (Tampa).

He received the Lester R. Ford Award in 2000 for his expository article A tale of two integrals. He is a corresponding member (1993), member of the Hungarian Academy of Sciences (2001). In 2015 he was elected as a fellow of the American Mathematical Society "for contributions to classical analysis and approximation theory and for exposition."

== His books ==
- Z. Ditzian, V. Totik: Moduli of smoothness, Springer Series in Computational Mathematics, 9, Springer-Verlag, New York, 1987. x+227 pp. ISBN 0-387-96536-X
- Herbert Stahl, Vilmos Totik: General orthogonal polynomials, Encyclopedia of Mathematics and its Applications, 43 Cambridge University Press, Cambridge, 1992. xii+250 pp. ISBN 0-521-41534-9
- V. Totik: Weighted approximation with varying weight, Lecture Notes in Mathematics, 1569. Springer-Verlag, Berlin, vi+114 p. (1994). ISBN 3-540-57705-X
- Edward B. Saff, Vilmos Totik: Logarithmic potentials with external fields, Appendix B by Thomas Bloom. Grundlehren der Mathematischen Wissenschaften 316 Springer-Verlag, Berlin, 1997. xvi+505 pp. ISBN 3-540-57078-0
- Péter Komjáth, Vilmos Totik: Problems and Theorems in Classical Set Theory, Springer-Verlag, Berlin, 2006. ISBN 0-387-30293-X
- Vilmos Totik: Metric Properties of Harmonic Measures, 163 pp, American Mathematical Society, 2006, ISBN 0-8218-3994-2
