= András Sebő =

Hungarian-French mathematician

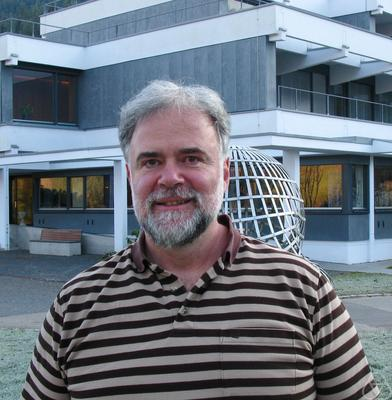
- Mathematical Institute Oberwolfach, 2011
- Born: 24 April 1954 (age 72); Budapest
- Education: Eötvös Loránd University
- Scientific career
- Fields: Mathematics
- Workplaces: CNRS, University of Grenoble
- Doctoral advisor: András Frank

András Sebő (born 24 April 1954) is a Hungarian-French mathematician working in the areas of combinatorial optimization and discrete mathematics. Sebő is a French National Centre for Scientific Research (CNRS) Director of Research and the former head of the Combinatorial Optimization. group in Laboratory G-SCOP, affiliated with the University of Grenoble and the CNRS.

== Biography ==
Sebő received his Ph.D. in 1984 from Faculty of Sciences of the Eötvös Loránd University and he obtained the Candidate's Degree from the Hungarian Academy of Sciences in 1989, advised by András Frank. From 1979 through 1988, Sebő was a Research Assistant and Research Fellow at The Computer and Automation Research Institute, Hungarian Academy of Sciences in Budapest. He moved to the University of Grenoble in 1988, where he advanced to his current position of CNRS Director of Research. He has held visiting positions at leading mathematical centers, including the Research Institute for Discrete Mathematics in Bonn, Germany (1988-89 as an Alexander von Humboldt Foundation Fellow and 1992-93 as the John von Neumann Professor), DIMACS (1989), University of Waterloo Faculty of Mathematics (multiple years), and the Hausdorff Center for Mathematics (2015). He is also one of seven honorary members of the Egerváry Research Group on Combinatorial Optimization.

== Research work ==
In 2012, Sebő and Jens Vygen developed a 7/5-approximation algorithm for the graph version of the traveling salesman problem; currently the best-known approximation, improving on the widely cited 1.5-epsilon result of Gharan, Saberi, and Singh. In 2013, Sebő found also an 8/5-approximation algorithm for the path version of the TSP. A scientific conference in honor of Sebő was held April 24–25, 2014 in Grenoble, France.
