= László Pyber =

Hungarian mathematician

László Pyber (born 8 May 1960 in Budapest) is a Hungarian mathematician. He is a researcher at the Alfréd Rényi Institute of Mathematics, Budapest. He works in combinatorics and group theory.

== Biography ==
Pyber received his Ph.D. from the Hungarian Academy of Sciences in 1989 under the direction of László Lovász and Gyula O.H. Katona with the thesis Extremal Structures and Covering Problems.

In 2007, he was awarded the Academics Prize by the Hungarian Academy of Sciences.

In 2017, he was the recipient of an ERC Advanced Grant.

== Mathematical contributions ==
Pyber has solved a number of conjectures in graph theory. In 1985, he proved the conjecture of Paul Erdős and Tibor Gallai that edges of a simple graph with n vertices can be covered with at most n−1 circuits and edges. In 1986, he proved the conjecture of Paul Erdős that a graph with n vertices and its complement can be covered with n^{2}/4 + 2 cliques.

He has also contributed to the study of permutation groups. In 1993, he provided an upper bound for the order of a 2-transitive group of degree n not containing A_{n} avoiding the use of the classification of finite simple groups. Together with Tomasz Łuczak, Pyber proved the conjecture of McKay that for every ε>0, there is a constant C such that C randomly chosen elements invariably generate the symmetric group S_{n} with probability greater than 1−ε.

Pyber has made fundamental contributions in enumerating finite groups of a given order n. In 1993, he proved that if the prime decomposition of n is n=p_{1}^{g_{1}} ⋯ p_{k}^{g_{k}} and μ=max(g_{1},...,g_{k}), then the number of groups of order n is at most

$n^{(\frac{2}{27}+o(1))\mu^2}.$

In 2004, Pyber settled several questions in subgroup growth by completing the investigation of the spectrum of possible subgroup growth types.

In 2011, Pyber and Andrei Jaikin-Zapirain obtained a surprisingly explicit formula for the number of random elements needed to generate a finite d-generator group with high probability. They also explored related questions for profinite groups and settled several open problems.

In 2016, Pyber and Endre Szabó proved that in a finite simple group L of Lie type, a generating set A of L either grows, i.e., |A^{3}| ≥ |A|^{1+ε} for some ε depending only on the Lie rank of L, or A^{3}=L. This implies that diameters of Cayley graphs of finite simple groups of bounded rank are polylogarithmic in the size of the group, partially resolving a well-known conjecture of László Babai.
