= György Alexits =

Hungarian mathematician

György Alexits (5 January 1899 - 14 October 1978), born in Budapest, was a Hungarian mathematician, and a member of the Hungarian Academy of Sciences.

Alexits is the author of Konvergenzprobleme der Orthogonalreihen (1960), translated as Convergence Problems of Orthogonal Series (Pergamon, 1961).
