= Budapest Semesters in Mathematics =

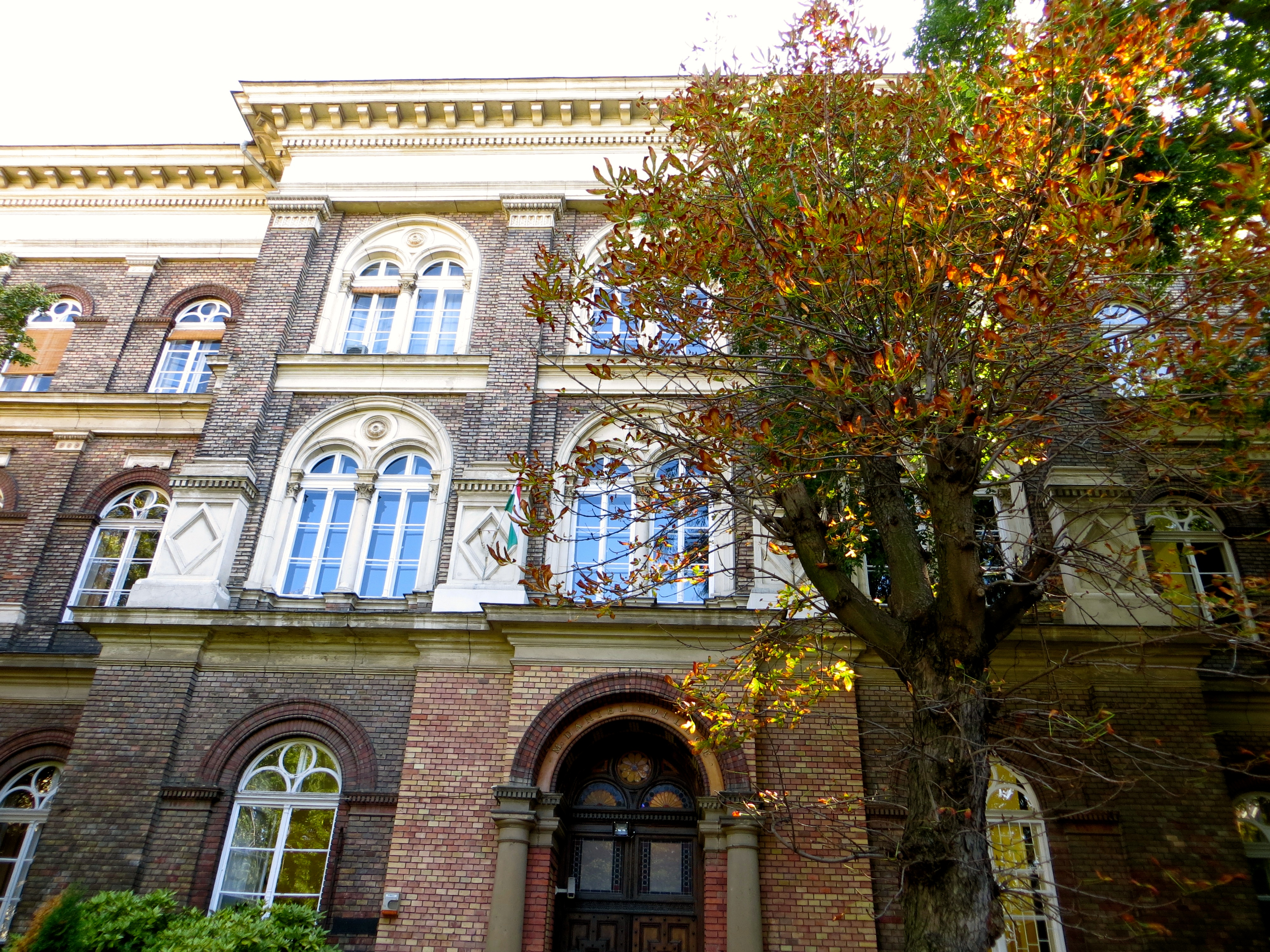
A photo of the front of the schoolbuilding College International in Budapest, Hungary.

The Budapest Semesters in Mathematics program is a study abroad opportunity for North American undergraduate students in Budapest, Hungary. The coursework is primarily mathematical and conducted in English by Hungarian professors whose primary positions are at Eötvös Loránd University or the Alfréd Rényi Institute of Mathematics of the Hungarian Academy of Sciences. Originally started by László Lovász, László Babai, Vera Sós, and Pál Erdős, the first semester was conducted in Spring 1985. The North- American part of the program is currently run by Tina Garrett (North American Director) out of St. Olaf College in Northfield, MN. She is supported by Kendra Killpatrick (associate director) and Eileen Shimota (Program Administrator). The former North American Directors were Paul D. Humke (1988–2011) and Tom Trotter. The Hungarian director is Dezső Miklós. The first Hungarian director was Gábor J. Székely (1985–1995).

== Courses offered ==
Courses commonly offered at BSM:

- Introduction to Abstract Algebra
- Advanced Abstract Algebra
- Topics in Analysis
- Complex Functions
- Combinatorics 1
- Combinatorics 2
- Commutative Algebra
- Conjecture and Proof
- Functional Analysis
- Elementary Problem Solving
- Galois Theory
- Topics in Geometry
- Graph Theory
- Number Theory
- Topics in Number Theory
- Probability Theory
- Real Functions and Measures
- Set Theory
- Introduction to Topology
- Mathematical Physics
- Independent Research Groups
- Theory of Computing
- Differential Geometry
- Dynamical Systems and Bifurcations
- Stochastic Models in Bioinformatics
- Mathematical Logic

In addition to mathematics-based courses, students have the opportunity to take culture classes, such as beginning and intermediate Hungarian Language classes, Hungarian Arts and Culture, and Holocaust and Memory.

== Location ==
Classes are held in the College International, located at Bethlen Gábor Tér in the heart of Pest in Budapest's District VII. This is also the location for several other programs which attract both Hungarian and international students. Entry to the building is monitored; each student receives a card that electronically admits him or her to the building. There are also cameras to monitor movement exterior to the building. Several tram and bus lines have stops near the school, as does the Red Metro Line, which stops at Keleti railway station.

== Optional intensive language course ==
Prior to classes starting, students can arrive early to attend an optional two-week, 80-hour intensive language course at the Babilon Nyelvstúdió. Babilon is located at Astoria, right in front of Budapest's Great Synagogue. For approximately eight hours each day, students are immersed in the language, learning numbers, greetings, and other necessary vocabulary.

== See also ==
- The North American home page of the program
- The Hungarian home page of the program (in English)
- The page for the intensive language course
- Math in Moscow is a similar program held in Moscow, Russia.
