= Tamás Szőnyi =

Hungarian mathematician

Tamás Szőnyi (born July 23, 1957, Budapest) is a Hungarian mathematician, doing research in discrete mathematics, particularly finite geometry and algebraic coding theory. He is full professor at the department of computer science of the Eötvös Loránd University, Budapest, where he headed the department from 2004 to 2009 and was director of the Institute of Mathematics from 2014 to 2017. He was vice chairman of the mathematical committee of the Hungarian Academy of Sciences from 2006 to 2011. He received the candidate's degree in 1991 under László Lovász and the Doctor of Science title from the Hungarian Academy of Sciences in 2001.

Szőnyi created a successful school in finite geometry at ELTE, for which he received the Szele Tibor Memorial Medal of the János Bolyai Mathematical Society in 2013. He has done influential work on blocking sets and the polynomial method, including the resultant method developed with Zsuzsa Weiner. He was awarded the Officer's Cross of the Hungarian Order of Merit in 2012 and the Széchenyi Prize in 2020.
