= Jennifer Tour Chayes =

American computer scientist and mathematician

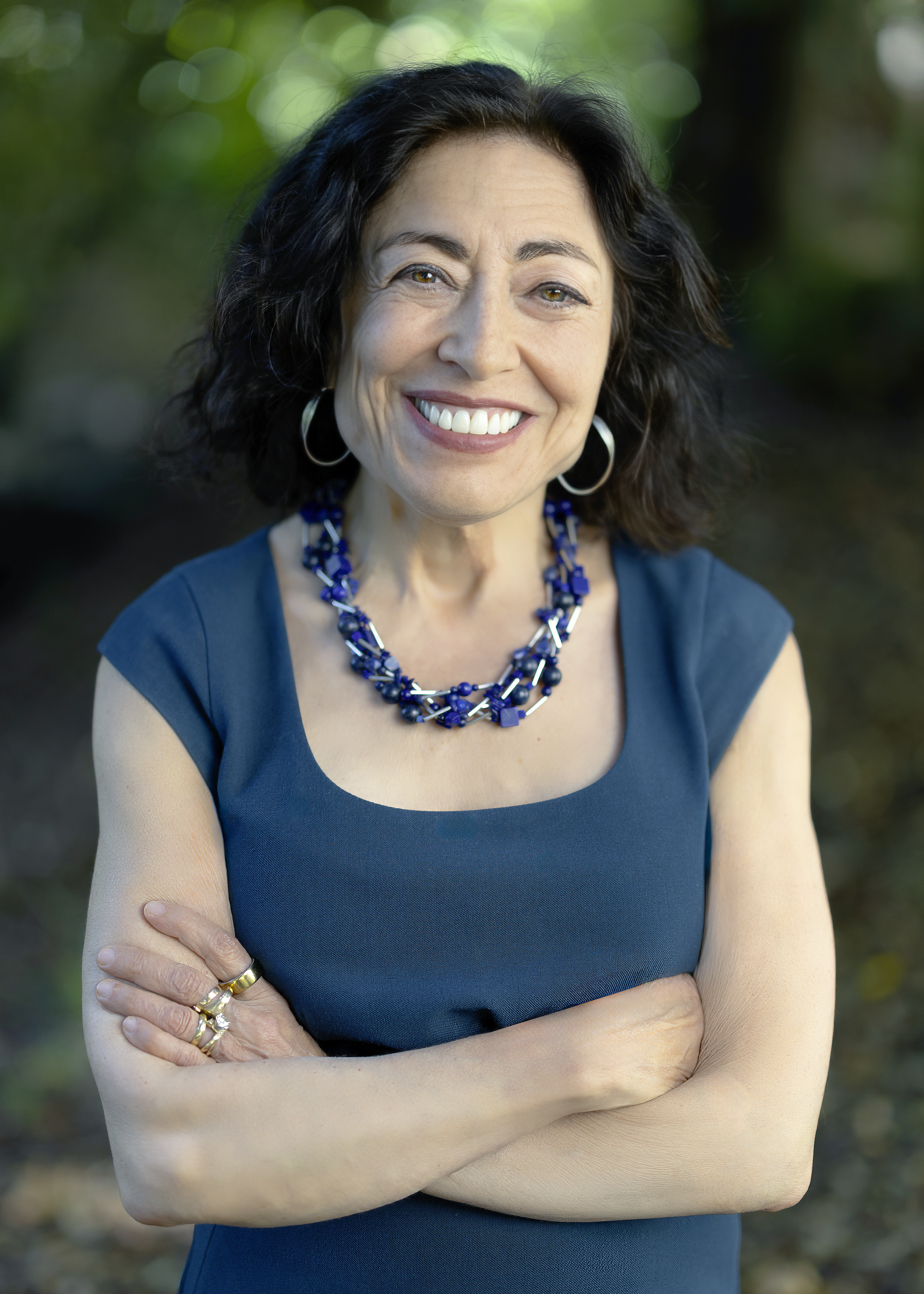
- Chayes in 2026
- Born: September 20, 1956 (age 70); New York City, New York, U.S.
- Education: Wesleyan University (BS); Princeton University (MS, PhD)
- Known for: Phase transitions Discrete mathematics Graph theory Game theory Network theory
- Spouse: Christian Borgs
- Scientific career
- Fields: Physics; Mathematics; Theoretical computer science
- Workplaces: UC Berkeley; Microsoft Research New England; Microsoft Research New York City; UCLA; Cornell University; Harvard University
- Thesis: The Inverse Problem, Plaquette Percolation and a Generalized Potts Model (1983)
- Doctoral advisor: Elliott H. Lieb; Michael Aizenman

Jennifer Tour Chayes is dean of the college of computing, data science, and society at the University of California, Berkeley. Before joining Berkeley, she was a technical fellow and managing director of Microsoft Research New England in Cambridge, Massachusetts, which she founded in 2008, and Microsoft Research New York City, which she founded in 2012.

Chayes is best known for her work on phase transitions in discrete mathematics and computer science, structural and dynamical properties of self-engineered networks, and algorithmic game theory. She is considered one of the world's experts in the modeling and analysis of dynamically growing graphs.

Chayes joined Microsoft Research in 1997, when she co-founded the Theory Group. She received her Ph.D. in mathematical physics at Princeton University in 1983. She is affiliate professor of mathematics and physics at the University of Washington, and was a professor of mathematics at the University of California, Los Angeles from 1987 to 2001. She is an author on almost 120 scientific papers and the inventor on more than 25 patents.

== Early life and education ==
Chayes was born in New York City and grew up in White Plains, New York, the child of Iranian immigrants. She received her B.A. in Biology and Physics from Wesleyan University in 1979 where she graduated first in her class. She received her Ph.D. in Mathematical Physics at Princeton University. She did her postdoctoral work in the Mathematics and Physics departments at Harvard and Cornell.

== Career ==
She became a tenured mathematics professor at UCLA in 1987. While she was on sabbatical at the Institute for Advanced Study in 1997, Microsoft CTO Nathan Myhrvold, a classmate of Chayes's from Princeton, asked her to start and lead the Theory Group at Microsoft Research Redmond. The Theory Group analyzes fundamental questions in theoretical computer science using techniques from statistical physics and discrete mathematics. Chayes opened Microsoft Research New England in July 2008 with Borgs. The lab is located at the Microsoft New England Research & Development Center and is pursuing new, interdisciplinary areas of research that bring together core computer scientists and social scientists to understand, model, and enable future computing and online experiences. On May 3, 2012, The New York Times reported, "Microsoft is opening a research lab in New York City…" which Chayes will co-manage. The new lab also brings together computer scientists and social scientists, particularly in the areas of economics, computational and behavioral social sciences, and machine learning.

Prior to joining Berkeley, Chayes was Managing Director of both Microsoft Research New England and Microsoft Research New York City. She has contributed to the development of methods to analyze the structure and behavior of various networks, the design of auction algorithms, and the design and analysis of various business models for the online world. She also served on the Mathematical Sciences jury for the Infosys Prize from 2016 to 2018.

== Affiliations ==
Chayes serves on numerous institute boards, advisory committees and editorial boards, including the Turing Award Selection Committee of the Association for Computing Machinery, the board of trustees of the Mathematical Sciences Research Institute and the Institute for Computational and Experimental Research in Mathematics, the Advisory Boards of the Center for Discrete Mathematics and Computer Science, the Howard Hughes Medical Institute Janelia Farm Research Campus, and Women Entrepreneurs in Science and Technology. Chayes is a past chair of the Mathematics Section of the American Association for the Advancement of Science, and a past vice-president of the American Mathematical Society. She is the recipient of a National Science Foundation Postdoctoral Fellowship, a Sloan Fellowship, and the UCLA Distinguished Teaching Award.

Chayes is a Fellow of the American Association for the Advancement of Science, the Fields Institute, the Association for Computing Machinery, and the American Mathematical Society, as well as a National Associate of the National Academies. The Association for Women in Mathematics has included her in the 2020 class of AWM Fellows for "pioneering the way for women in the mathematical sciences to have leading technical roles in the high-tech industry; for extraordinary leadership and mentoring on behalf of women in the mathematical sciences". She has been the recipient of many leadership awards, including one of the 2012 Anita Borg Institute Women of Vision Awards. In 2019 she was elected to the National Academy of Sciences.

Chayes is featured in the Notable Women in Computing cards.

== Awards and honors ==
- Alfred P. Sloan Foundation Research Fellowship (1989)
- Member of Institute for Advanced Study, Princeton, NJ (1994–95, 1997)
- Invited Speaker at the International Congress of Mathematicians (1998)
- American Association for the Advancement of Science Fellow (2006)
- Association for Computing Machinery Fellow (2010)
- American Mathematical Society Fellow (2012)
- Anita Borg Institute Women of Vision Award (2012)
- Society for Industrial and Applied Mathematics John von Neumann Lecture Prize (2015)
- Leiden University honorary doctorate (2016)
- National Academy of Sciences member (2019)

== Personal life ==
Chayes married Christian Borgs in 1993 and was previously married to Lincoln Chayes whom she met at Wesleyan.

== See also ==
- VinFuture
