= Christian Borgs =

American computer scientist

- Education: LMU Munich
- Spouse: Jennifer Chayes
- Scientific career
- Fields: Computer Science, Mathematical Physics
- Workplaces: Free University of Berlin; Leipzig University; Microsoft Research; University of California, Berkeley
- Doctoral advisor: Erhard Seiler

Christian Borgs is a German-American computer scientist and mathematical physicist.

== Biography ==
He is a professor in the Department of Electrical Engineering and Computer Sciences at the University of California, Berkeley. Previously, he was the deputy managing director of Microsoft Research New England in Cambridge, Massachusetts, which he co-founded in 2008. Borgs' research includes developing the theory of graphons, computational analyses of the folk theorem (game theory), the planted clique, and the partition problem. For prior work on phase transitions, he was awarded the Karl Scheel Prize.

Borgs is a fellow of the American Mathematical Society and of the American Association for the Advancement of Science.
