= Fazekas Mihály Gimnázium =

Fazekas Mihály Gimnázium may refer to:

- Fazekas Mihály Gimnázium (Budapest)
- Fazekas Mihály Gimnázium (Debrecen)
