= Alexander Schrijver =

Dutch mathematician and computer scientist

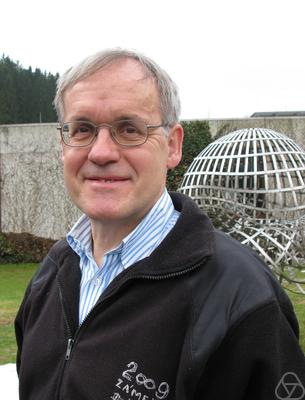
Lex Schrijver at Oberwolfach in 2010

Alexander (Lex) Schrijver (born 4 May 1948 in Amsterdam) is a Dutch mathematician and computer scientist, a professor of discrete mathematics and optimization at the University of Amsterdam and a fellow at the Centrum Wiskunde & Informatica in Amsterdam. Since 1993 he has been co-editor in chief of the journal Combinatorica.

== Biography ==
Schrijver earned his Ph.D. in 1977 from the Vrije Universiteit in Amsterdam, under the supervision of Pieter Cornelis Baayen. He worked for the Centrum Wiskunde & Informatica (under its former name as the Mathematisch Centrum) in pure mathematics from 1973 to 1979, and was a professor at Tilburg University from 1983 to 1989. In 1989 he rejoined the Centrum Wiskunde & Informatica, and in 1990 he also became a professor at the University of Amsterdam. In 2005, he stepped down from management at CWI and instead became a CWI Fellow.

== Awards and honors ==
Schrijver was one of the winners of the Delbert Ray Fulkerson Prize of the American Mathematical Society in 1982 for his work with Martin Grötschel and László Lovász on applications of the ellipsoid method to combinatorial optimization; he won the same prize in 2003 (shared with Satoru Iwata, Lisa Fleischer, and Satoru Fujishige) for showing submodular minimization to be strongly polynomial. He won the INFORMS Frederick W. Lanchester Prize in 1986 for his book Theory of Linear and Integer Programming, and again in 2004 for his book Combinatorial Optimization: Polyhedra and Efficiency. He was an Invited Speaker of the International Congress of Mathematicians (ICM) in 1986 in Berkeley and of the ICM in 1998 in Berlin. In 2003, he won the George B. Dantzig Prize of the Mathematical Programming Society and SIAM for "deep and fundamental research contributions to discrete optimization". In 2006, he was a joint winner of the INFORMS John von Neumann Theory Prize with Grötschel and Lovász for their work in combinatorial optimization, and in particular for their joint work in the book Geometric Algorithms and Combinatorial Optimization showing the polynomial-time equivalence of separation and optimization. In 2008, his work with Adri Steenbeek on scheduling the Dutch train system was honored with INFORMS' Franz Edelman Award for Achievement in Operations Research and the Management Sciences. He won the SIGMA prize of the Dutch SURF foundation in 2008, for a mathematics education project. In 2015 he won the EURO Gold Medal, the highest distinction within Operations Research in Europe.

In 2005 Schrijver won the Spinoza Prize of the NWO, the highest scientific award in the Netherlands, for his research in combinatorics and algorithms. Later in the same year he became a Knight of the Order of the Netherlands Lion. In 2002, Schrijver received an honorary doctorate from the University of Waterloo in Canada, and in 2011 he received another one from Eötvös Loránd University in Hungary.

Schrijver became a member of the Royal Netherlands Academy of Arts and Sciences in 1995. He became a corresponding member of the North Rhine-Westphalia Academy for Sciences and Arts in 2005, joined the German Academy of Sciences Leopoldina in 2006, and was elected to the Academia Europaea in 2008. In 2012 he became a fellow of the American Mathematical Society.

== Books ==
- Theory of Linear and Integer Programming (Wiley, 1986, reprinted 1998, ISBN 9780471982326)
- Grötschel, Martin; Lovász, László; Schrijver, Alexander (1993), Geometric algorithms and combinatorial optimization, Algorithms and Combinatorics, vol. 2 (2nd ed.), Springer-Verlag, Berlin, doi:10.1007/978-3-642-78240-4, ISBN 978-3-642-78242-8, MR 1261419
- Combinatorial Optimization (with William J. Cook, William H. Cunningham, and William R. Pulleyblank, Wiley and Sons, Wiley Series in Discrete Mathematics and Optimization 33, 1998, reprinted 2011, ISBN 9781118031391)
- Combinatorial Optimization: Polyhedra and Efficiency (Springer, Algorithms and Combinatorics 24, 2003, ISBN 9783540443896)
