= András Vargha =

Hungarian psychologist, statistician and psychiatrist

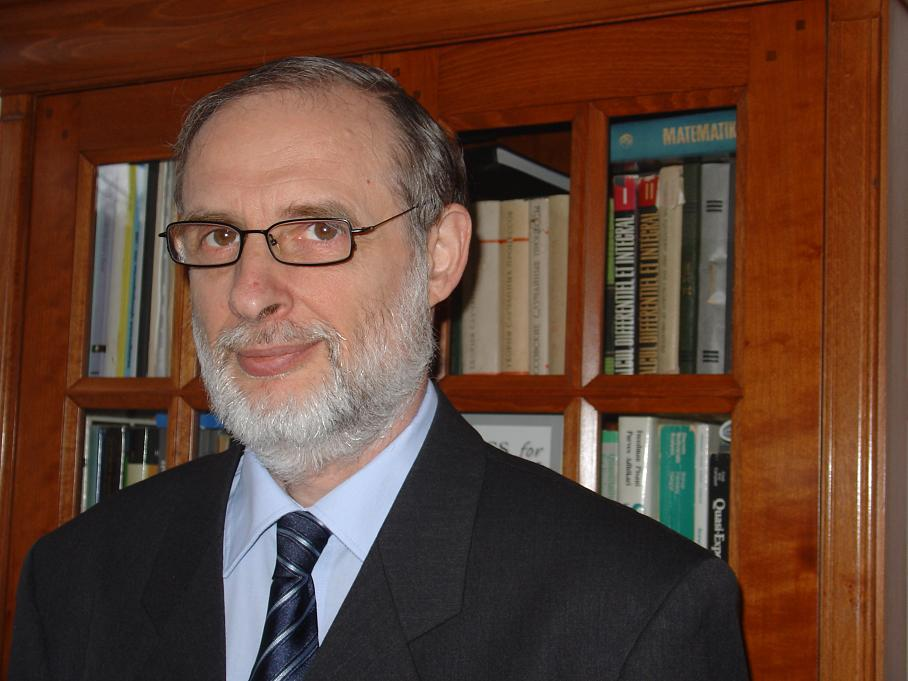

András Vargha (born Budapest, 29 November 1949) is a Hungarian psychologist and statistician, head of the Institute of Psychology of the Károli Gáspár University of Reformed Church. His research field is psychometrics, on which he has held conferences.

As of May 2011, Vargha had 131 journal publications with an impact factor of 14050, and has worked or continues to work as a reviewer with academic journals.
