= Martin Grötschel =

German mathematician (born 1948)

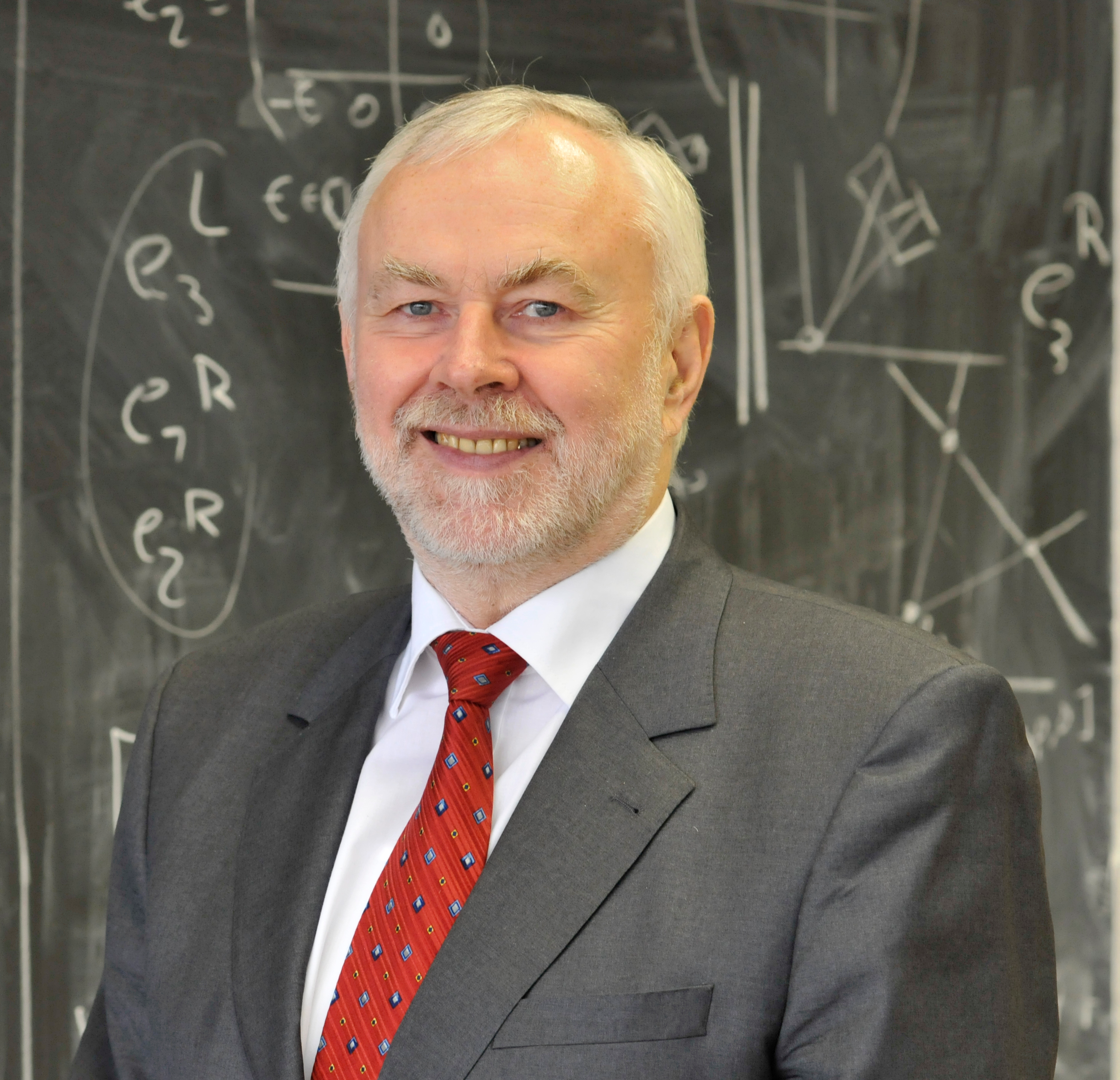

Martin Grötschel (born 10 September 1948) is a German mathematician known for his research on combinatorial optimization, polyhedral combinatorics, and operations research. From 1991 to 2012 he was Vice President of the Zuse Institute Berlin (ZIB) and served from 2012 to 2015 as ZIB's President. From 2015 to 2020 he was President of the Berlin-Brandenburg Academy of Sciences and Humanities (BBAW).

== Biography ==
Grötschel was born in Schwelm, Germany, and earned a diploma in mathematics with a minor in economics in 1973 from the University of Bochum. He completed a doctorate in 1977 at the University of Bonn under the supervision of Bernhard Korte, and obtained his habilitation at Bonn in the field of operations research in 1981. One year later he was appointed full professor of applied mathematics at the University of Augsburg. From 1991 until his retirement at the end of September 2015, he was, while also engaged at ZIB, full professor for information technology at Technische Universität Berlin. Martin Grötschel was a member of the Executive Committee of the German Mathematical Society (Deutsche Mathematiker-Vereinigung (DMV)) from 1989 to 1996 and from 1993 to 1994 its President. From 1999 to 2014 he was a member of the Executive Committee of the International Mathematical Union (IMU) and from 2007 to 2014 IMU's General Secretary. Since 2011 he has been a member of the Executive Board of the Einstein Foundation Berlin and was from 2011 to 2015 its Chair. He was co-founder and longstanding Chair of the DFG Research Center Matheon "Mathematics for key technologies".

Martin Grötschel has been married since 1976 to his wife Iris Grötschel and has three daughters.

== Work ==
Martin Grötschel is one of the most internationally renowned experts in the field of combinatorial optimization.

Martin Grötschel's main mathematical research fields are graph theory, linear and mixed-integer optimization and operations research. Already in his doctoral thesis, Grötschel achieved significant progress in the development of solution methods of the Traveling Salesman Problem, in particular, he contributed significantly to understanding the cutting-plane method. His publications together with L. Lovász and A. Schrijver on the ellipsoid method and its application in the combinatorial and convex optimization gained worldwide recognition.

In recent years Martin Grötschel has mainly dealt (besides addressing "classical" mathematical problems) with mathematical modelling and solving real-world problems in economy and industry. The application areas he has worked in include optimization of production planning and control, public transport and energy systems, logistics and telecommunication.

Since the early 1990s Grötschel has been working intensively in the fields of electronic information and communication, library systems, Open Access and Open Science and thereto participated in numerous national and international bodies and initiatives.

The promotion of digital humanities is one of the main goals of Grötschel's BBAW presidency.

== Awards and honors ==
Grötschel was one of the winners of the Fulkerson Prize of the American Mathematical Society in 1982 for his work with László Lovász and Alexander Schrijver on applications of the ellipsoid method to combinatorial optimization. In 2006 the same trio won the John von Neumann Theory Prize of the Institute for Operations Research and the Management Sciences.

The Society for Industrial and Applied Mathematics and Mathematical Optimization Society gave Grötschel the George B. Dantzig Prize in 1991, and the Deutsche Forschungsgemeinschaft gave him the Gottfried Wilhelm Leibniz Prize in 1995. In 2004 he was awarded the EURO Gold Medal, the highest distinction within Operations Research in Europe. He was an invited speaker at the 2006 International Congress of Mathematicians.

Grötschel received honorary doctorates from the University of Karlsruhe in 2006, from the Vietnamese Academy of Sciences and Technology (VAST) in 2007, from the Otto-von-Guericke-Universität Magdeburg in 2008 and from the University of Augsburg in 2011. Since 2011 he has been Distinguished Affiliated Professor at the Technical University of Munich.

Grötschel is member of seven national and international scientific academies: In 1995 he was a member the Berlin-Brandenburg Academy of Sciences and Humanities, in 1999 he became Foreign Member of the US National Academy of Engineering (NAE) for "contributions to combinatorial optimization and its applications", since 2003 he has been a member of the Deutsche Akademie der Technikwissenschaften (acatech), since 2005 of the German National Academy of Sciences Leopoldina, since 2015 of the Chinese Academy of Sciences (CAS) as Foreign Member, since 2016 of The World Academy of Sciences (TWAS) for the advancement of science in the developing countries as Fellow, and in 2017 he was elected a member of the Academy of Europe Academia Europaea.

In 2013, a festschrift was published in his honor.

== Selected publications ==
- Grötschel, Martin; Lucas, Klaus; Mehrmann, V. L., eds. (2010). Production factor mathematics. Heidelberg: Springer. ISBN 978-3-642-11248-5. OCLC 668095703.
- Grötschel, Martin; Lovász, László; Schrijver, Alexander (1993), Geometric algorithms and combinatorial optimization, Algorithms and Combinatorics, vol. 2 (2nd ed.), Springer-Verlag, Berlin, doi:10.1007/978-3-642-78240-4, ISBN 978-3-642-78242-8, MR 1261419
- Graham, Ronald L.; Grötschel, Martin; Lovász, László (1995). Handbook of combinatorics. Amsterdam: Elsevier. ISBN 0-444-88002-X. OCLC 32626230.
