= Péter Komjáth =

Hungarian mathematician

- Born: 8 April 1953 (age 73); Budapest
- Education: Eötvös Loránd University
- Awards: Paul Erdős Prize
- Scientific career
- Fields: Mathematics
- Workplaces: Eötvös Loránd University
- Doctoral advisor: András Hajnal

Péter Komjáth (born 8 April 1953) is a Hungarian mathematician, working in set theory, especially combinatorial set theory. Komjáth is a professor at the Faculty of Sciences of the Eötvös Loránd University. He is currently a visiting faculty member at Emory University in the department of Mathematics and Computer Science.

Komjáth won a gold medal at the International Mathematical Olympiad in 1971. His Ph.D. advisor at Eötvös was András Hajnal, and he has two joint papers with Paul Erdős. He received the Paul Erdős Prize in 1990. He is a member of the Hungarian Academy of Sciences.

== Selected publications ==
- Komjáth, Péter and Vilmos Totik: Problems and Theorems in Classical Set Theory, Springer-Verlag, Berlin, 2006. ISBN 0-387-30293-X
- Komjáth, Péter (1988), "A simplified construction of nonlinear Davenport–Schinzel sequences", Journal of Combinatorial Theory, Series A, 49 (2): 262–267, doi:10.1016/0097-3165(88)90055-6, MR 0964387.
- Komjáth, Péter (1988), "Consistency results on infinite graphs", Israel Journal of Mathematics, 61 (3): 285–294, doi:10.1007/BF02772573, MR 0941243, S2CID 123105669.
- Komjáth, Péter (2011), "The chromatic number of infinite graphs—A survey" (PDF), Discrete Mathematics, 311 (15): 1448–1450, doi:10.1016/j.disc.2010.11.004.
