= Gyula O. H. Katona =

Hungarian mathematician

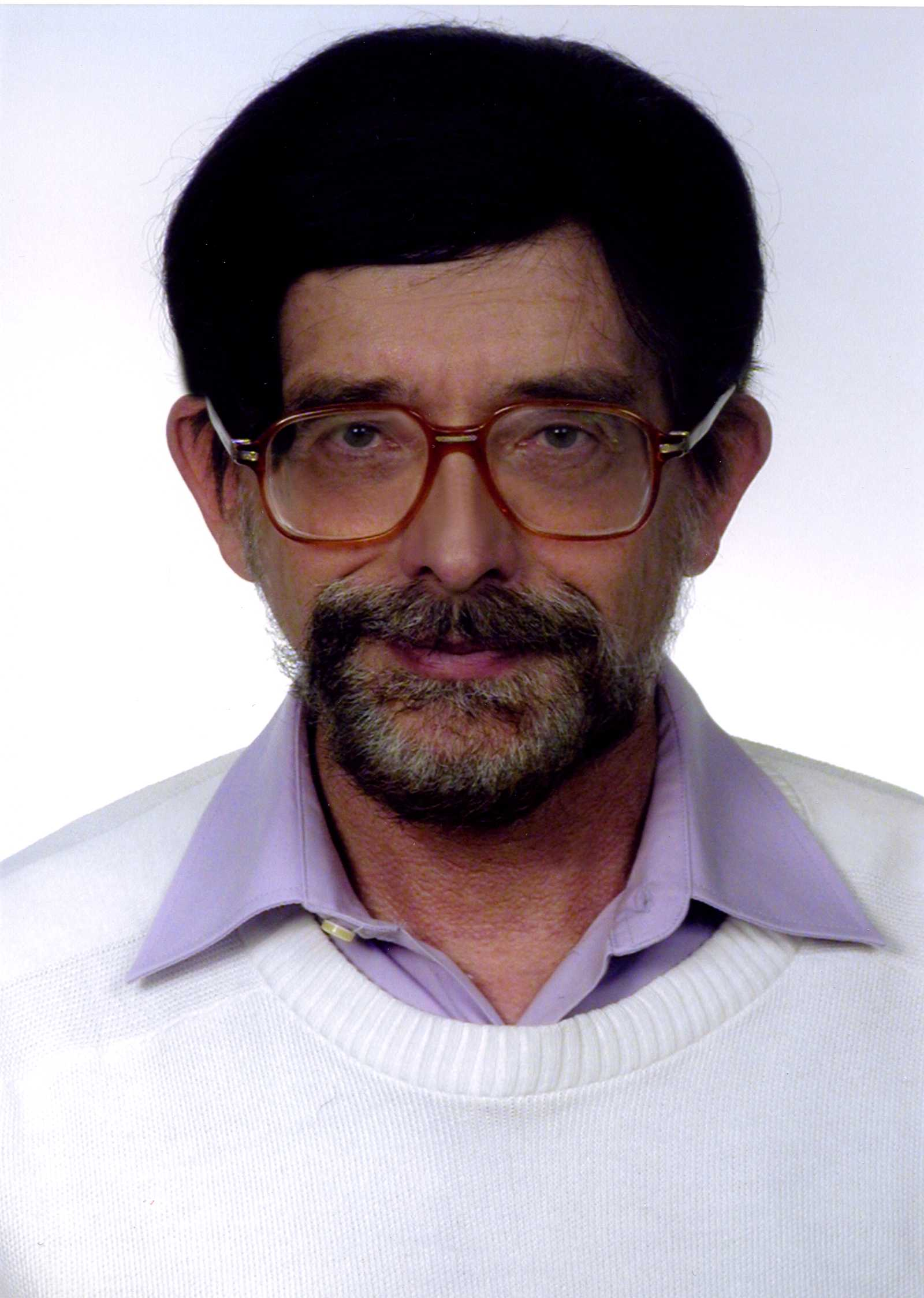
Gyula Katona

Gyula O. H. Katona (born 16 March 1941 in Budapest) is a Hungarian mathematician known for his work in combinatorial set theory, and especially for the Kruskal–Katona theorem and his beautiful and elegant proof of the Erdős–Ko–Rado theorem in which he discovered a new method, now called Katona's cycle method. Since then, this method has become a powerful tool in proving many interesting results in extremal set theory. He is affiliated with the Alfréd Rényi Institute of Mathematics of the Hungarian Academy of Sciences.

Katona was secretary-general of the János Bolyai Mathematical Society from 1990 to 1996. In 1966 and 1968 he won the Grünwald Prize, awarded by the Bolyai Society to outstanding young mathematicians, he was awarded the Alfréd Rényi Prize of the Hungarian Academy of Sciences in 1975, and the same academy awarded him the Prize of the Academy in 1989. In 2011 the Alfréd Rényi Institute, the János Bolyai Society and the Hungarian Academy of Sciences organized a conference in honor of Katona's 70th birthday.

Gyula O.H. Katona is the father of Gyula Y. Katona, another Hungarian mathematician with similar research interests to those of his father. His youger son is Zsolt Katona is a professor at University of California, Berkeley.
