= János Bolyai Mathematical Society =

The János Bolyai Mathematical Society (Bolyai János Matematikai Társulat, BJMT) is the Hungarian mathematical society, named after János Bolyai, a 19th-century Hungarian mathematician, a co-discoverer of non-Euclidean geometry. It is the professional society of the Hungarian mathematicians, applied mathematicians, and mathematics teachers. It was founded in 1947, as one of the two successor societies of the Mathematical and Physical Society (Matematikai és Fizikai Társulat) founded in 1891. It is a member-society of the European Mathematical Society.

== Presidents of the Society ==
- László Rédei (1947–1949)
- György Alexits (1949–1963)
- György Hajós (1963–1972)
- László Fejes Tóth (1972–1975)
- Pál Turán (1975–1976)
- János Surányi (1976–1980)
- Ákos Császár (1980–1990)
- András Hajnal (1990–1996)
- Imre Csiszár (1996–2006)
- Gyula Katona (2006–2018)
- Péter Pál Pálfy (2018–)

== Periodicals ==
The society publishes the following periodicals.

- Középiskolai Matematikai Lapok (KöMaL) monthly for highschool students (since 1894)
- Matematikai Lapok a journal containing expository articles and reports on the activities of the Society (since 1950)
- Periodica Mathematica Hungarica a general mathematics research journal (since 1971)
- Combinatorica, a journal publishing original research papers in combinatorics and computer science (since 1981)
- Colloquia Mathematica Societatis, Janos Bolyai

== Awards ==
- Manó Beke Commemorative Prize, given to at most 7 mathematics teachers (since 1950)
- Géza Grünwald Commemorative Prize for young researchers (since 1953)
- Gyula Farkas Commemorative Prize to young researchers in applied mathematics (since 1973)
- Tibor Szele Commemorative Medal for major researchers who created scientific schools
- László Patai Commemorative Prize for supporting one student or young researcher (since 1994)

== Competitions ==
- the József Kürschák Mathematical Competition for high school students (since 1891)
- the Miklós Schweitzer Competition
