= ELTE Faculty of Science =

Eötvös Loránd University - Faculty of Science
- ELTE Természettudományi Kar
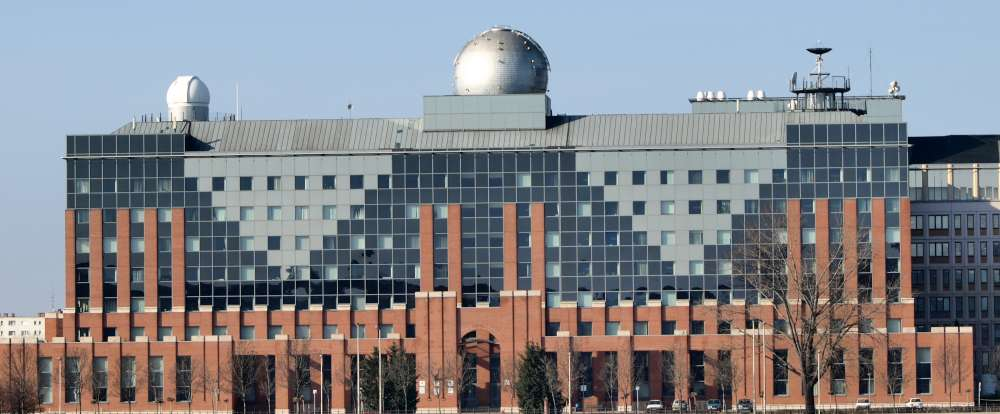
- Northern building
- Type: public
- Established: 1949
- Dean: Imre Kacskovics
- Total staff: 1000
- Students: 4000
- Location: 1/A Pázmány Péter sétány, Budapest, 1117, Hungary
- Campus: Urban
- Sporting affiliations: Budapesti EAC
- Website: ttk.elte.hu

The Faculty of Science of Eötvös Loránd University was founded in 1949 and it is located in Lágymányos Campus, Újbuda, Budapest, Hungary.

== History ==
The Faculty of Science was established on 16 May 1949. In order to develop and improve the teaching of natural sciences, a separate faculty, the Faculty of Science was created from 22 departments and one institute. Before 1949, the Faculty of Humanities, Sciences, Law and Political Science and Medicine constituted one big faculty. The new faculty consisted of 5 institutes: the Institute of Biology, the Institute of Physics, the Institute of Geography, the Institute of Chemistry, and the Institute of Mathematics.

In 2005, József Gál along with Victor Benno Meyer-Rochow of the Jacobs University Bremen was awarded with the ig Nobel Prize.

In 2010, a former student, Judit Nagy, died in a traffic accident at the age of 47. Nagy was a leading scientist in biochemistry at Imperial College London.

In 2012, Endre Szemerédi was awarded with an Abel Prize.

In 2021, László Lovász, along with Avi Wigderson of the Institute for Advanced Study in Princeton, was awarded with an Abel Prize.

During the COVID-19 pandemic, the dean, Imre Kacskovics, was often interviewed and worked as a consultant for the Hungarian prime minister, Viktor Orbán.

On 17 December 2021, the Faculty's former student, Árpád Pusztai, died. He made a career at The Rowett Institute in Aberdeen Scotland. He was known for his research in biochemistry and the Pusztai affair.

The European Commission appointed three new members to the governing body of the leading European scientific organisation, including László Lovász, professor of mathematics at Faculty and former president of the Hungarian Academy of Sciences on 1 March 2022.

During the Russo-Ukrainian War, free courses were offered for Ukrainian students.

In April 2022, new quantum processors were purchased by Eötvös Loránd University.

According to the AD scientific index, among the top 10 most influential scientists at the Eötvös Loránd University are from the Faculty of Science.

On 1 July 2022, Katalin Karikó, Hungarian-American biochemist who specializes in RNA-mediated mechanisms, was awarded with an honorary doctorate by the university.

In 2023, a former Bachelor of Science graduate, Ferenc Krausz, was awarded Nobel Prize in Physics.

== Institutes ==
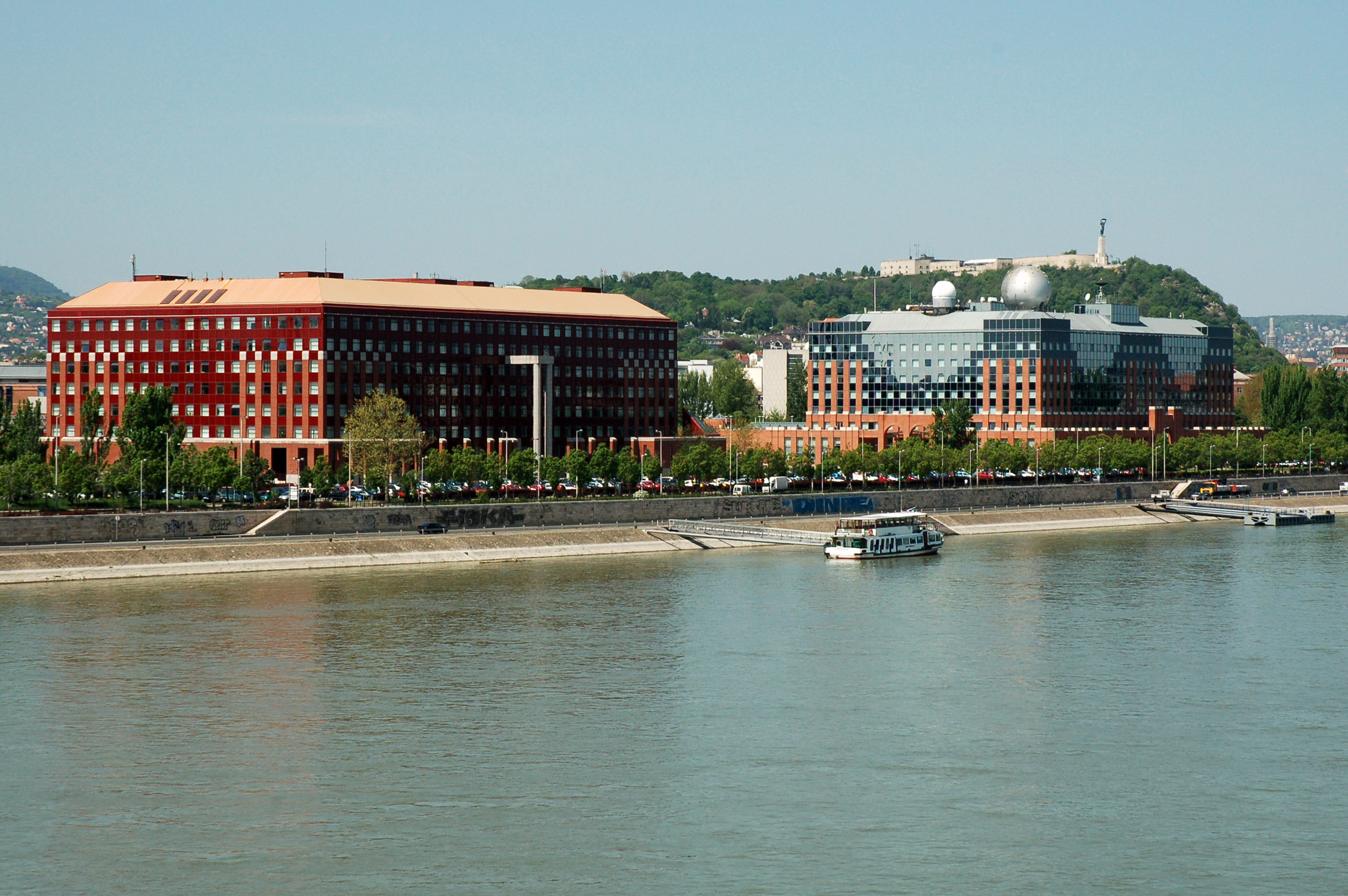
Lágymányosi Campus of the university, home of the Faculty of Science, the Faculty of Social Sciences, and the Faculty of Informatics

Institute	Department
Institute of Biology	Department of Anatomy, Cell and Developmental Biology; Department of Systematic Zoology and Ecology; Department of Biochemistry; Department of Biological Anthropology; Department of Ethology; Department of Physiology and Neurobiology; Department of Genetics; Department of Immunology; Department of Microbiology; Department of Plant Physiology and Molecular Plant Biology; Department of Plant Systematics, Ecology and Theoretical Biology; Department of Plant Anatomy
Institute of Chemistry	Department of Analytical Chemistry; Department of Physical Chemistry; Department of Organic Chemistry; Department of Inorganic Chemistry
Institute of Geography and Earth Sciences	Centre Of Geography; Centre Of Earth Sciences
Institute of Mathematics	Department of Algebra and Number Theory; Department of Analysis; Department of Applied Analysis and Computational Mathematics; Department of Computer Science; Department of Geometry; Mathematics Teaching and Education Centre; Department of Operations Research; Department of Probability Theory and Statistics
Institute of Physics	Department of Materials Physics; Department of Atomic Physics; Department of Biological Physics; Department of Theoretical Physics; Department of Physics of Complex Systems

== Deans ==
- Aladár Buzágh: 1949–1950
- György Hajós: 1950–1951
- Tibor Erdey-Grúz: 1950–1951
- Ferenc Kárteszi: 1951–1954
- László Fuchs: 1954–1956
- Gusztáv Mödlinger: 1953–1958
- Sándor Lengyel: 1958–1961
- Károly Nagy: 1961–1966
- Kálmán Sztrókay: 1967–1968
- László Egyed: 1966–1967 and 1968–1970
- Imre Kátai: 1970–1977
- Imre Kubovics: 1977–1983
- Kálmán Medzihradszky: 1983–1989
- István Klinghammer: 1989–1990
- Ádám Kiss: 1990–1997
- András Benczúr: 1997–2001
- Ferenc Láng: 2001–2005
- György Michaletzky: 2005–2012
- Péter Surján: 2012–2018
- Péter Sziklai: 2018–2019
- Imre Kacskovics: 2019–present

== Research ==
In 2015, András Kovács, researcher at the Institute of Geography and Earth Sciences, was interviewed by the Guardian on his group's discovery. His research team found a supervoid. In other words, the largest structure discovered in the universe.

A research group, led by Attila Andics, was featured in Forbes. The title of the article was "Science Reveals How Your Pet Really Feels About Your Affection". In 2018, another research group, led by Gábor Horváth, successfully modelled the Kordylewski clouds.

Zsolt Demetrovics's study was featured on the Guardian entitled "Cyberchondria and cyberhoarding: is internet fuelling new conditions?"

A study conducted by a research group of the Faculty of Science was featured in the BBC, entitled "Separation from your phone 'makes you stressed within minutes."

In an article entitled "Cows Can Be Toilet Trained", Paula Perez Fraga was interviewed on dog and pig behaviour.

In 2020, Gergely Balázs's study on salamanders was featured in USA Today. He found that a rare olm salamander didn't move for more than seven years. The results of his study was published in the Journal of Zoology in 2020. A study, led by Ádám Miklósi, was featured on USAToday.com, entitled "Why is your dog tilting its head? New study dives into the adorable habit". The findings of their study was published in Animal Cognition, entitled 'An exploratory analysis of head-tilting in dogs'. In 2022, a study conducted by Laura Cuaya, from the Department of Ethology of the Institute of Biology, was featured in the BBC. Another study, led by Attila Andics, was also featured in the BBC entitled 'Dogs can recognise their owners by their voice alone'.

== Notable researchers ==
Institute	Researcher
Institute of Biology	János Balogh, Endre Dudich, Enikő Kubinyi, Ádám Miklósi, Rebeka Szabó, Eörs Szathmáry
Institute of Chemistry	Tibor Gánti, István T. Horváth, András Perczel, Péter Surján, Carl von Than, Gergely Tóth, Lajos Winkler, Géza Zemplén
Institute of Geography and Geology	Béla Balázs, László Egyed, Ferenc Horváth, Béla Nagy
Institute of Mathematics	László Babai, Zsolt Baranyai, József Beck, Károly Bezdek, Béla Bollobás, Ákos Császár, Imre Csiszár, György Elekes, Lipót Fejér, László Fejes Tóth, András Frank, László Fuchs, István Gyöngy, András Hajnal, György Hajós, Gábor Halász, Gyula O. H. Katona, Péter Komjáth, Miklós Laczkovich, László Lempert, László Lovász, Katalin Marton, János Pintz, Lajos Pósa, András Prékopa, Alfréd Rényi, Rózsa Péter, Miklós Simonovits, Ágoston Scholtz, Tamás Szőnyi, Vera T. Sós, Ottó Szász, Katalin Vesztergombi, István Vincze
Institute of Physics	Gyula Dávid, Loránd Eötvös, Imre Fényes, Lajos Jánossy, Ányos Jedlik, Frigyes Károlyházy, György Marx, Károly Nagy, Gábor Takács, László Tisza, Tamás Vicsek

== Notable alumni ==
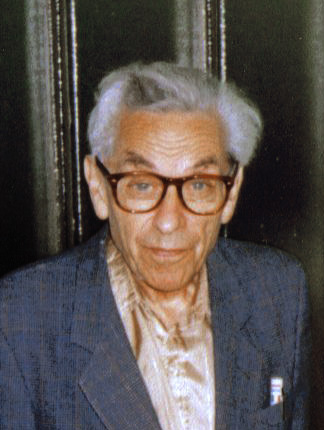
Pál Erdős in 1992

The following is a list of scientists who achieved success worldwide:

- János Aczél, mathematician
- Miklós Ajtai, computer scientist
- Béla Andrásfai, mathematician
- Hajnal Andréka, mathematician
- Gergely Arató, politician
- László Babai, mathematician and computer scientist
- Zsolt Baranyai, mathematician
- Emanuel Beke, mathematician
- György Békéssy, biophysicist (Nobel Prize in Physiology or Medicine in 1961)
- Gyula Bereznai, mathematician
- Károly Bezdek, mathematician
- Béla Bollobás, mathematician
- Miklós Bóna, mathematician
- Ákos Császár, mathematician
- Imre Csiszár, mathematician
- Marianna Csörnyei, mathematician
- György Elekes, mathematician
- Loránd Eötvös, physicist
- Pál Erdős, mathematician
- László Fejes Tóth, mathematician
- Gyula Farkas, mathematician
- István Fáry, mathematician
- Lipót Fejér, mathematician
- István Fenyő, mathematician
- Péter Frankl, mathematician
- László Fuchs, mathematician
- Zoltán Füredi, mathematician
- Peter Gacs, mathematician
- Janos Galambos, mathematician
- Tibor Gallai, mathematician
- Zoárd Geőcze, mathematician
- George Grätzer, mathematician
- András Gyárfás, mathematician
- András Hajnal, mathematician
- György Hevessy, chemist (Nobel Prize in Chemistry in 1943)
- John Horvath, mathematician
- Imre Izsák, mathematician
- Benedek Jávor, politician
- Ányos Jedlik, physicist
- István Juhász, mathematician
- László Kalmár, mathematician
- Frigyes Károlyházy, mathematician
- Gyula O. H. Katona, mathematician
- Béla Kerékjártó, mathematician
- Péter Kiss, mathematician
- Lipót Klug, mathematician
- János Kollár, mathematician
- János Komlós, mathematician
- Gábor Korchmáros, mathematician
- András Kornai, mathematician
- János Körner, mathematician
- Ferenc Krausz, physicist (Nobel Prize in Physics in 2023)
- József Kürschák, mathematician
- Miklós Laczkovich, mathematician
- Cornelius Lanczos, mathematician
- László Lempert, mathematician
- László Lovász, mathematician (Abel Prize in 2021)
- Elod Macskasy, mathematician
- Michael Makkai, mathematician
- Katalin Marton, mathematician
- Pál Medgyessy, mathematician
- Paul G. Mezey, chemist
- János Neumann, physicist
- Gyula J. Obádovics, mathematician
- Géza Ottlik, writer, translator, mathematician
- János Pach, mathematician
- Péter Pál Pálfy, mathematician
- János Pintz, mathematician
- George Pólya, mathematician
- Lajos Pósa, mathematician
- András Prékopa, mathematician
- László Rátz, mathematician
- László Rédei, mathematician
- Marcel Riesz, mathematician
- Alfréd Rényi, mathematician
- Gedeon Richter, pharmacist
- Imre Ritter, mathematician
- Elizabeth Rona, chemist
- Imre Z. Ruzsa, mathematician
- Rózsa Péter, mathematician
- Gábor N. Sárközy, mathematician
- András Sebő, mathematician
- Simon Sidon, mathematician
- Miklós Simonovits, mathematician
- József Solymosi, mathematician
- Rebeka Szabó, politician
- Zoltán Szabó, mathematician
- Ottó Szász, mathematician
- Mario Szegedy, mathematician
- Endre Szemerédi, mathematician (Abel Prize in 2012)
- Éva Tardos, mathematician
- Károly Than, chemist
- Van H. Vu, mathematician
- Vera T. Sós, mathematician

== Library ==
The Library of the Faculty of Science is located on the Lágymányos Campus in Pázmány Péter sétány. The library has five collections:

1. Biological collection
2. Geographical and earth sciences collection
3. Physics collection
4. Chemistry collection
5. Mathematical collection

== Gallery ==
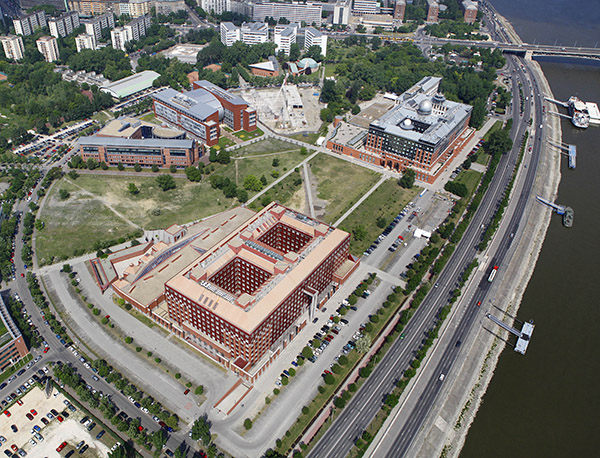
Bird view
