= University of Veterinary Medicine Budapest =

University in Budapest, Hungary

- Állatorvostudományi Egyetem
- Type: Public university
- Established: 1787; 239 years ago
- Rector: Péter Sótonyi
- Location: 1078 Budapest, István utca 2, Budapest, Hungary; 47.5035°N 19.0779°E
- Campus: Urban
- Website: univet.hu/en

University of Veterinary Medicine Budapest is a state-owned university in Budapest, Hungary.

== Past and present of the University of Veterinary Medicine Budapest ==
The predecessor of the University of Veterinary Medicine Budapest (UVMB) was established as a department of the Faculty of Medicine of the University of Pest in 1787. The development of the national public veterinary services in the 19th century and the establishment of the provincial and district level veterinary offices resulted in a growing need for trained veterinary professionals, capable of demonstrating both theoretical and practical competence. This triggered an intensive development of the institution, including structural, educational and infrastructure development. From 1851 UVMB became an independent educational and research institution (initially called as Imperial-Royal Veterinary Institution of Pest, later Hungarian Royal Veterinary Institution) specializing in training of veterinarians, providing diagnostic and health care services and providing support for the work of the governmental veterinary offices. The opening of the current main campus of UVMB in the heart of Budapest also dates back to this period (1881).

Besides classical veterinary disciplines, UVMB also offers BSc and MSc in Biology and MSc in Zoology Research. In recent years Veterinary Public Health also become a prioritised field in the education and research, covering food hygiene, food safety risk analysis and food waste reduction.

Training in UVMB is available in three languages: English, German and Hungarian for students coming from about 60 countries of the world.

UVMB has been accredited by the European Association of Establishments for Veterinary Education (EAEVE).

== Educational and research units ==
Current educational and research units of UVMB:

- Animal Breeding, Nutrition and Laboratory Animal Science Department
- Center for Animal Welfare
- Centre for Bioinformatics
- Department and Clinic of Equine Medicine
- Department and Clinic of Internal Medicine
- Department and Clinic of Surgery and Ophthalmology
- Department of Anatomy and Histology
- Department of Animal Breeding and Genetics
- Department of Animal Hygiene, Herd Health and Mobile Clinic
- Department of Applied Food Science - Centre for Food Consumption and Food Waste Research
- Department of Biostatistics
- Department of Botany
- Department of Chemistry
- Department of Clinical Pathology and Oncology
- Department of Digital Food Science
- Department of Ecology
- Department of Exotic Animal and Wildlife Medicine
- Department of Food Hygiene
- Department of Foreign Languages
- Department of Microbiology and Infectious Diseases
- Department of Obstetrics and Food Animal Medicine Clinic
- Department of Parasitology and Zoology
- Department of Pathology
- Department of Pharmacology and Toxicology
- Department of Physical Education
- Department of Physiology and Biochemistry
- Department of Veterinary Forensics and Economics
- Digital Food Chain Education, Research, Development and Innovation Institute
- Division of Immunoendocrinology and Radioisotopes
- Doctoral School of Veterinary Sciences
- Experimental Farm
- External Department of Food Chain Safety
- External Department of Dairy Research
- Institute for Biology

== Rectors of UVMB since 1899 ==
- Ferenc Hutÿra (1899-1931)
- Ágoston Zimmermann (1939-1940)
- Rezső Manninger (1947-1948)
- Gyula Sályi (1958-1963)
- Jenő Kovács (1963-1966)
- András B. Kovács (1966-1972)
- Ferenc Kovács (1973-1978, 1983–1990)
- László Várnagy (1978-1981)
- Péter Tamás Sótonyi (2017–present)

== Notable alumni ==
- Tolnay Sándor (1747–1818)
- Zlamál Vilmos (1803–1886)
- Szabó Alajos (1818–1904)
- Thanhoffer Lajos (1843–1909)
- Klug Nándor (1845–1909)
- Azary Ákos (1850–1888)
- Preisz Hugó (1860–1940)
- Hutÿra Ferenc (1860–1934)
- Magyary-Kossa Gyula (1865–1944)
- Korányi Sándor (1866–1944)
- Marek József (1868–1952)
- Aujeszky Aladár (1869–1933)
- Mócsy János (1895–1976)
- Bartha Adorján (1923–1996)
- Kovács Ferenc (1921–2015)
- Haraszti János (1924–2007)
- Pethes György (1926–2008)
- Mészáros János (1927–2018)
- Kutas Ferenc (1931)
- Simon Ferenc (1934)
- Rafai Pál (1940)
- Varga János (1941)
- Solti László (1946)
- Imre Kacskovics
- Kemény Dénes (1978)
- Wladár Sándor
- Bolu Eso (2019)
