= Ágoston Scholtz =

Hungarian mathematician

- Born: 27 July 1844; Kotterbach, Austro-hungarian empire; today Rudňany, Slovakia
- Died: 6 May 1916 (aged 71); Veszprém, Austro-hungarian empire; today Hungary
- Education: University of Vienna; University of Berlin
- Known for: Hunyadi–Scholtz theorem
- Scientific career
- Fields: Mathematics
- Workplaces: University of Budapest
- Thesis: Some theorems on the whole form of hexagrammum mysticum (1879)
- Doctoral students: József Kürschák; Frigyes Riesz; Lipót Fejér

Ágoston Scholtz (1844–1916) was a Hungarian mathematician, one of the founders of the Hungarian Mathematics and Physics Association.

== Life and work ==
Scholtz attended the schools of Igló (now Spišská Nová Ves), Rosenau (now Rožňava) and Löcse (now Levoča). After his secondary education he studied in the universities of Vienna and Berlin, graduating in 1865. After teaching several years at secondary level, he obtained the university habilitation in 1879 and began his teaching in the Hungarian Royal University of Budapest (now Loránd Eötvös University).

Scholtz's field of research was projective geometry and theory of determinants. He collaborated extensively with Jenő Hunyady, for this reason both names are associated with their results: Hunyadi–Scholtz determinant theorem and Hunyadi–Scholtz matrix.

== Bibliography ==
- Szénássy, Barna; Bognár, János (1992). History of Mathematics in Hungary Until the 20th Century. Springer. ISBN 9783540554974.
- Rodríguez Hernández, Laura Regina (2006). "Friedrich Riesz' Beiträge zur Herausbildung des modernen mathematischen Konzepts abstrakter Räume" (PDF). Doctoral Dissertation. University of Mainz.
