= Árpád Varecza =

Hungarian mathematician (1941–2005)

- Born: 6 September 1941; Vác, Hungary
- Died: 26 September 2005 (aged 64); Nyíregyháza, Hungary
- Education: Eötvös Loránd University, Budapest
- Scientific career
- Fields: Mathematics
- Workplaces: College of Nyíregyháza

Árpád Varecza (6 September 1941 – 26 September 2005), was a Hungarian mathematician, former lecturer at the College of Nyíregyháza, head of the Institute of Mathematics and Informatics, and deputy director general of the institution for three years.

== Biography ==
He was born on September 6, 1941, in Vác. He graduated from the teacher training college in Szeged in 1963, then graduated from ELTE with a degree in mathematics, physics and technology. His first jobs were tied to his birthplace. He taught at the Primary School in Váchartyán and Verőce, then at the Géza Király Secondary School and Vocational Secondary School in Vác. He was admitted to the Department of Mathematics of the Teacher Training College in Nyíregyháza in 1969 as an assistant lecturer, in 1971 he was appointed an assistant professor, in 1977 he was appointed an associate professor and in 1983 he was appointed a college teacher. Between 1977 and 1980 he was an aspirant at the Mathematical Research Institute of the Hungarian Academy of Sciences. In 1975 he received his Ph.D. at Kossuth Lajos University, and in 1982 he defended his Ph.D. Following the era marked by the name of Gyula Bereznai, he was head of the Department of Mathematics in 1984, then Head of the Institute of Mathematics and Informatics in 2000, and served as Deputy Director General of the institution for three years.

== Work ==
He specialized in combinatorics, including "sorting algorithms". He obtained his candidate's degree in his dissertation on "Optimal sorting algorithms". Honorary Heir President of the János Bolyai Mathematical Society, President of the Department of Mathematics, Physics and Astronomy of the DAB, Chairman of the College's Scientific Committee, Member of the MM Intensive Further Education Council and of the MM Computer Science Advisory Board, He was the editor of the Mathematics series. Under his guidance, in 1985, four colleagues earned their Ph.D.

== Books ==
- Mathematics competitions for teacher training colleges
- A tanárképző főiskolák Péter Rózsa matematikai versenyei
