= Geőcze =

Geőcze is a Hungarian surname. Notable people with the surname include:

- Sarolta Geőcze (1862–1928), Hungarian women's rights activist and educator
- Zoárd Geőcze (1873–1916), Hungarian mathematician
