= Chief veterinary officer (Hungary) =

The Chief Veterinary Officer of Hungary, as a chief veterinary officer, is the supervisor of the National Food Chain Safety Office, and in general, the governmental veterinary services including animal health, animal protection and welfare and food chain safety control. Besides organizing and operating veterinary public health, he plays a significant role in international agricultural and trade affairs, in which the animal health and food safety status usually an important issue. His responsibilities are detailed in the law XLVI of 2008 on food chain and its authority control.

== List ==
This is a list of the chief veterinary officers of Hungary in chronological order:

- 1945-1948: Dr. Kolgyári László
- 1948-1953: Dr. Kádár Tibor
- 1953-1953: Dr. Láng Miklós
- 1953-1963: Dr. Pusztai Oszkár
- 1963-1973: Dr. Kádár Tibor
- 1973-1978: Dr. Dénes Lajos
- 1978-1990: Dr. Glózik András
- 1990-1992: Dr. Simor Ferenc
- 1992-1995: Dr. Nagy Attila
- 1995-1996: Dr. Fehérvári Tamás
- 1996-2000: Dr. Bálint Tibor
- 2000-2002: Dr. Németh Antal
- 2002-2005: Dr. Bálint Tibor
- 2005-2010: Dr. Süth Miklós
- 2010-2014: Dr. Kardeván Endre
- 2014-2022: Dr. Bognár Lajos
- 2022- : Dr. Pásztor Szabolcs
