= Ádám Miklósi =

Hungarian ethologist and expert on dog cognition

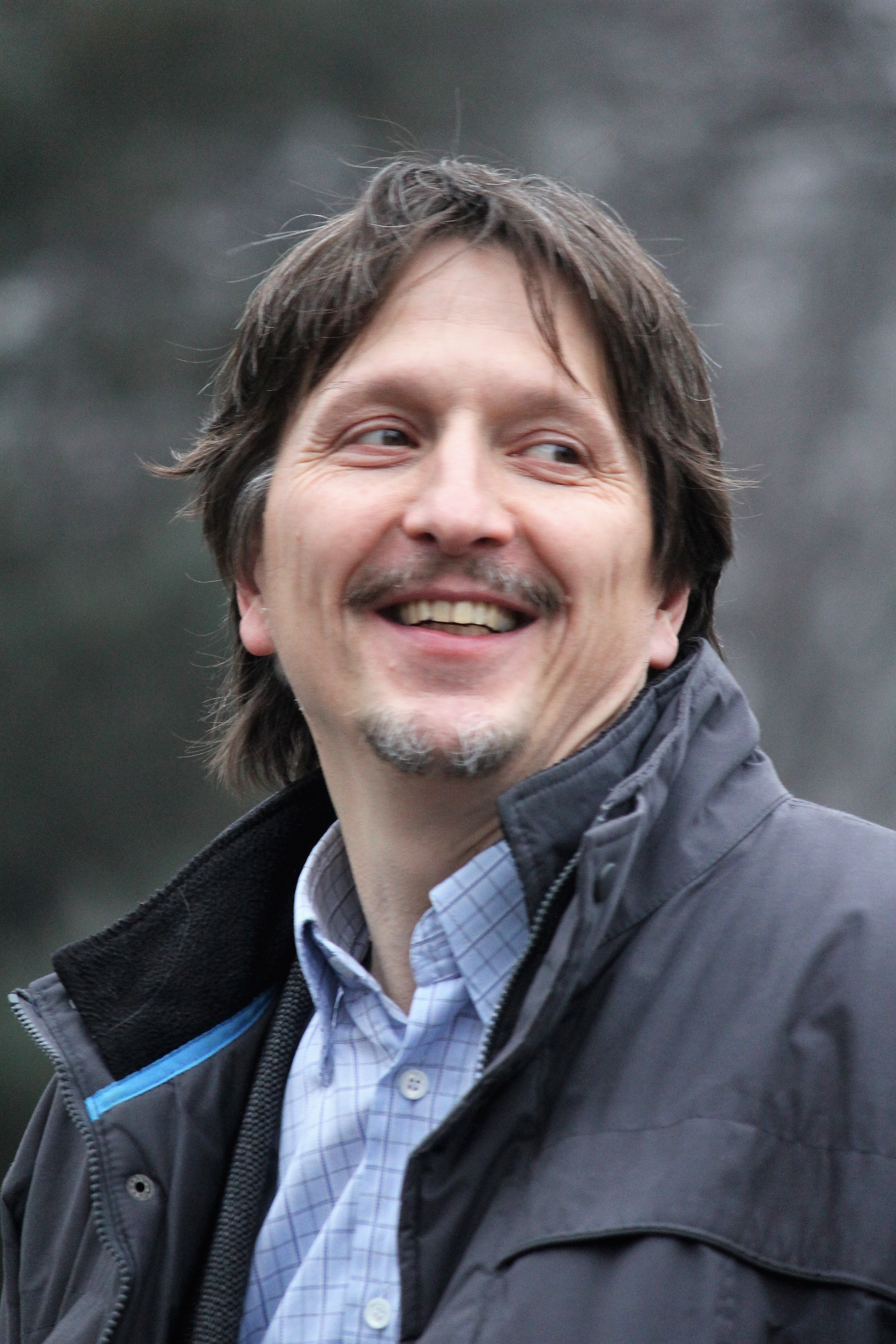
- Ádám Miklósi
- Born: September 25, 1962 (age 62); Budapest, Hungary
- Education: PhD in Ethology, Hungarian Academy of Sciences (1995); Habilitation, Eötvös Loránd University (2005); DSc in Biology, Hungarian Academy of Sciences (2005); Corresponding member of the Hungarian Academy of Sciences (2016); Full member of the Hungarian Academy of Sciences (2022)
- Awards: Prize for Research Achievements Hungarian Academy of Sciences (2015); Distinguished Scholar Award, International Association for Human-Animal Interaction Organisation (2010); Széchenyi Prize (2023)
- Scientific career
- Fields: Ethologist
- Institutions: Department of Ethology Eötvös Loránd University

Ádám Miklósi (born 25 September 1962) is a Hungarian ethologist, expert on dog cognition and behavior. He holds the position of professor and, between 2006 and 2024, head of the Ethology Department at the Faculty of Sciences of the Eötvös Loránd University in Budapest, Hungary. In 2016 he was elected as a corresponding member, in 2022 as a full member of the Hungarian Academy of Sciences. He is the co-founder and leader of the Family Dog Project, which aims to study human-dog interaction from an ethological perspective. In 2014 he published the 2nd edition of an academic volume entitled Dog Behaviour, Evolution, and Cognition by Oxford University Press

== Bibliography ==
- List of publications at the MTMT
- List of publications at Google scholar

=== Books ===
- Dog Behaviour, Evolution, and Cognition
- The Dog - A Natural History
