= Péter Surján =

Hungarian theoretical chemist (born 1955)

Péter R. Surján
- Born: August 30, 1955 (age 69)
- Education: Eötvös Loránd University
- Known for: Research on applications of second quantization
- Scientific career
- Institutions: Eötvös Loránd University; Technical University of Budapest

Péter R. Surján (born August 30, 1955) is a Hungarian theoretical chemist who is known for his research on application of the theory of second quantization in quantum chemistry.

In 2016 a festschrift from Theoretical Chemistry Accounts journal was published in his name which is also published as a book in Highlights in Theoretical Chemistry series by the Springer Nature. He is currently a professor and a former dean of the Faculty of Science of the Eötvös Loránd University.

== Academic career ==
Surján received his Master's degree in physics in 1978 and his PhD in quantum chemistry in 1981, both from (Eötvös Loránd University. In 1986, he was a Candidate of Science. From there, he worked at the Technical University of Budapest as a senior researcher in physics from 1990 to 1995 before moving to Eötvös Loránd University, where he has been since. He has taught in the Department of Theoretical Chemistry since 1991, becoming a full professor in 1998, and has been the Director of the Bolyai College (2007-2012) and the Institute of Chemistry (2008-2012). He was also the dean of the Faculty of Science.

Surján is a member of the Hungarian Academy of Sciences (1998) and has been on the editorial boards of the Journal of Mathematical Chemistry and Interdisciplinary Sciences: Computational Life Sciences. He has also been a guest editor for the International Journal of Quantum Chemistry. Surján has published more than 190 papers in his scientific career. His first paper was published in 1980.

== Selected publications ==
=== Papers ===
- "Optical Rotatory Strength Calculation by Evaluating the Gradient Matrix through the Equation of Motion", Theoretica Chimica Acta 55, 103 (1980); doi:10.1007/BF00576955
- "Higher excitations in coupled-cluster theory", The Journal of Chemical Physics 115, 2945 (2001); doi:10.1063/1.1383290
- "A general state-selective multireference coupled-cluster algorithm", The Journal of Chemical Physics 117, 980 (2002); doi:10.1063/1.1483856
- "Computing coupled-cluster wave functions with arbitrary excitations", The Journal of Chemical Physics 113, 1359 (2000); doi:10.1063/1.481925
- "An observable-based interpretation of electronic wavefunctions: application to “hypervalent” molecules", Computational and Theoretical Chemistry 255, 9 (1992); doi:10.1016/0166-1280(92)85003-4

=== Books ===
- Surján, Péter R. (1989). Second Quantized Approach to Quantum Chemistry. Springer-Verlag Berlin Heidelberg. p. 184. doi:10.1007/978-3-642-74755-7. ISBN 978-3-642-74757-1.
- Surján, Péter R., ed. (1999). Correlation and Localization. Topics in Current Chemistry. Vol. 203. Springer-Verlag Berlin Heidelberg. p. 236. doi:10.1007/3-540-48972-X. ISBN 978-3-540-65754-5.
