= József Kürschák =

Hungarian mathematician

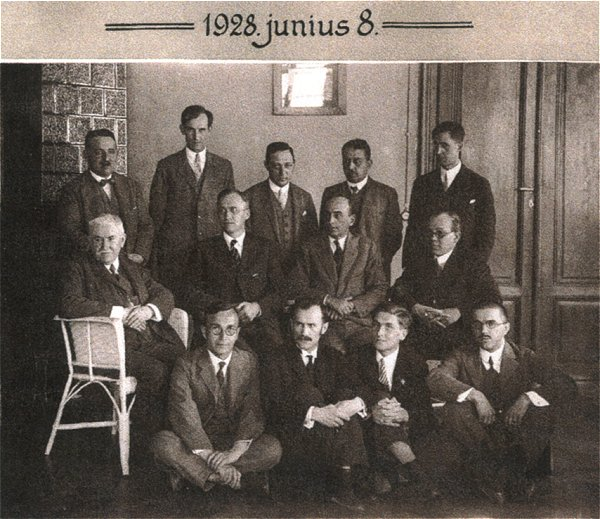
- Left to right, standing: Frigyes Riesz, Béla Kerékjártó, Alfréd Haar, Dénes Kőnig, Rudolf Ortvay, on chairs: József Kürschák, George David Birkhoff, O.D. Kellog, Lipót Fejér, sitting on the floor: Tibor Radó, István Lipka, László Kalmár, Pál Szász
- Born: 14 March 1864; Buda, Kingdom of Hungary
- Died: 26 March 1933 (aged 69); Budapest, Kingdom of Hungary
- Education: Technical University of Budapest
- Scientific career
- Fields: Mathematics
- Workplaces: Technical University of Budapest
- Doctoral students: Dénes Kőnig

József Kürschák (14 March 1864 – 26 March 1933) was a Hungarian mathematician noted for his work on trigonometry and for his creation of the theory of valuations. He proved that every valued field can be embedded into a complete valued field which is algebraically closed. In 1918 he proved that the sum of reciprocals of consecutive natural numbers is never a natural number. Extending Hilbert's argument, he proved that everything that can be constructed using a ruler and a compass, can be constructed by using a ruler and the ability to copy a fixed segment. He was elected a member of the Hungarian Academy of Sciences in 1897. He was one of the main organisers of mathematics competitions, for example, Eötvös Loránd mathematics competition.

== Biography ==
He was born in Buda to András Kürschák and Jozefa Teller. After completing high school, he studied physics and mathematics from 1881 to 1886 at the Royal University of Pest, where he was a pupil of Gyula Kőnig and Jenő Hunyady. At the same time, as a member of the Budapest Secondary School Teacher Training Institute, he also visited philosophical and literary performances at the university. In 1886, he started his career as a deputy teacher at Fazekas Mihály Gimnázium in Debrecen, but in the same year, taking advantage of the opportunity, he was a probationary candidate in the grammar school of the Budapest Secondary School Teacher Training Institute. He taught at the Gimnázium until 1888 and at that time also graduated from the Budapest University of Science with a mathematics-physics degree. He became a teacher at the Primary Grammar School in Rozsnyó (today Rožňava, Slovakia). In 1890 he obtained his doctoral degree and in 1890–1981 he was deputy teacher at the Markó street public high school.

In 1891 he obtained a degree in mathematics at the Royal Joseph University of Budapest, where he taught until his death. At first he did not give up on high school education, continuing to teach from 1893 to 1896. In 1891–1892, he worked as an assistant professor of geometry. From 1904 he taught as a public lecturer in mathematics at the university. From 1906 to 1909 he was the Dean of the Department of General and Chemical Engineering, and between 1916 and 1918 he was the rector of the University of Art and Design.
