= Gyula Bereznai =

Hungarian mathematician

- Born: 1 May 1921; Sátoraljaújhely, Hungary
- Died: 6 September 1990 (aged 69); Nyíregyháza, Hungary
- Education: Eötvös Loránd University, Budapest
- Known for: Bereznai Gyula
- Awards: Emanuel Beke memorial prize
- Scientific career
- Fields: Mathematics
- Workplaces: College of Nyíregyháza

Gyula Bereznai (1 May 1921 – 6 September 1990) was a Hungarian mathematician and former head of department at a Teacher Training College in Nyíregyháza.

== Biography ==
He was born in Sátoraljaújhely on 1 May 1921. He completed his elementary school in Tornyospálca, the secondary school in Kisvárda. His studies at the University of Debrecen were interrupted by the war (captivity). After six years in prison, he received a degree in mathematics from Eötvös Loránd University, Budapest. After the Nyíregyháza Vocational School and the Kölcsey Grammar School, he was admitted to the mathematics department of the Bessenyei György Teacher Training College in 1962. From 1969 to 1983 he was head of the department. For more than two decades he taught the future generation of teachers the basics of mathematical analysis, to whom he tried to pass on his knowledge and experience, and he was always happy to share it with his colleagues. Besides his professional security, he tried to shape his students with his own high standards. He was loved and respected by his colleagues and students, but the same can be said of mathematics teachers in the county, for whom he has organized and held numerous advanced lectures. He was not an ordinary individual, he was a true, well-educated teacher who was proficient not only in mathematics but also in physics, chemistry, and philosophy. His work is marked by numerous professional and methodological publications. He has written and edited several books and examples.

== Work ==
His specialty was mathematical analysis.
Former member of the editorial board of Teaching Mathematics.
The Mathematical Competition named after Gyula Bereznai has been held annually since 1991.

Quote from the publication A Simple Convergence Criterion:

Theorem: If there is a real $\sum_{}a_n$ for a positive numeric string $p>e$ and a natural $N$ such that every time $n>N$, each time

$$\left(\frac{a_n}{a_{n+1}}\right)^{n} \ge p$$,

then the series is convergent. And if

$$\left(\frac{a_n}{a_{n+1}}\right)^n \le e$$,

then the series $\sum_{}a_n$ is divergent.

Thus Bereznai's theorem is:

Let $\left(a_n\right)$ be a sequence of positive numbers, such that there exists $p \in \mathbb{R}$
with $\left(\frac{a_n}{a_{n+1}}\right)^n \ge p > e\ (n=1,2,...)$. Then the series $\sum_{n=1}^\infty{a_n}$ is convergent.
If $\left(\frac{a_n}{a_{n+1}}\right)^n \le e$, then the series is divergent.

The theorem was generalized by József Sándor.

" It is known that Gyula Bereznai's method is more effective than the so-called D'Alembert quotient, which is most commonly used to decide the positive convergence of numerical lines and the so-called Raabe-Duhamel Method. That is, Gyula Bereznai's result, among other things, provides a useful tool for the study of a very intensively researched branch of mathematics, harmonic analysis." (Dr. Habil. György Gát)

One of his students, who had good results in other subjects, asked, "Mr. professor, is it because I am weak in maths? can I be a minister? " Uncle Gyuszi didn't think twice about answering: "Sure, you can be a minister, why not?"

== Awards ==
- 1960 – János Bolyai Mathematical Society Emanuel Beke memorial prize

== Books ==
- Pythagorean theorem
- History of numerals
- Mathematics competitions for teacher training colleges
