= Dénes Kőnig =

Hungarian mathematician (1884–1944)

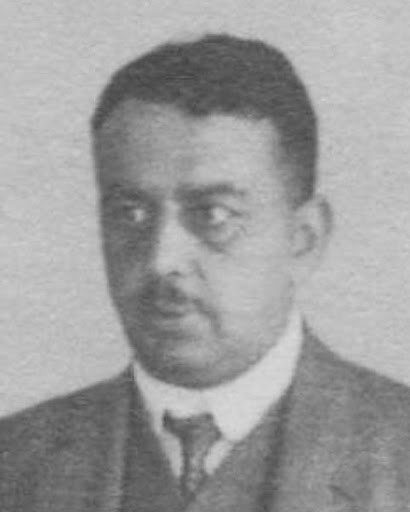
- In 1928
- Born: September 21, 1884; Budapest, Austria-Hungary
- Died: October 19, 1944 (aged 60); Budapest, Hungary
- Education: Technical University of Budapest
- Known for: Publishing the first textbook on Graph theory
- Father: Gyula Kőnig
- Scientific career
- Fields: Mathematics
- Workplaces: Technical University of Budapest
- Doctoral advisor: József Kürschák; Hermann Minkowski
- Doctoral students: Tibor Gallai

Dénes Kőnig (September 21, 1884 – October 19, 1944) was a Hungarian mathematician of Hungarian Jewish heritage who worked in the field of graph theory and wrote its first textbook.

== Biography ==
Kőnig was born in Budapest, the son of mathematician Gyula Kőnig. In 1907, he received his doctorate at, and joined the faculty of the Royal Joseph University in Budapest (today Budapest University of Technology and Economics). His classes were visited by Paul Erdős, who, as a first year student, solved one of his problems. Kőnig became a full professor there in 1935. In memory of their father, who died in 1913, Kőnig and his brother György created the Gyula Kőnig prize in 1918. This prize was meant to be an endowment for young mathematicians, however was later devaluated. But the prize remained as a medal of high scientific recognition. In 1899, he published his first work while still attending High School in a journal Matematikai és Fizikai Lapok. After his graduation in 1902, he won first place in a mathematical competition "Eötvös Loránd". Shortly after he wrote the first of two book collections Matematikai Mulatságok (Mathematical Entertainments). He spent four semesters at the university in Budapest and his last five in Göttingen, during which he studied under the famous mathematicians József Kürschák and Hermann Minkowski. He then received his doctorate in 1907 due to his dissertation in geometry, that same year he began working for the Technische Hochschule in Budapest and remained a part of the faculty till his death in 1944. At first he started as an assistant in problem sessions, in 1910 he was promoted to "oberassistant", and then promoted to "Privatdocent" in 1911 teaching nomography, analysis situs (later to be known as topology), set theory, real numbers and functions, and graph theory (the name "graph theory" didn't appear in the university catalogue until 1927). During this time he would be a guest speaker giving mathematics lecture for architecture and chemistry students, in 1920 these lectures made their way into book form. at the Technische Hochschule.

The young Kőnig

From 1915 to 1942 he was on a committee to judge school contests in mathematics, collecting problems for these contests, and organizing them. Then in 1933 he was elected as secretary of the society and in 1942 he became the chairman of this committee. He then decided to make edits in the society's journal during his time on the committee till his death.

Kőnig's activities and lectures played a vital role in the growth of graph theoretical work of: László Egyed, Paul Erdős, Tibor Gallai, György Hajós, József Kraus, Tibor Szele, Pál Turán, Endre Vázsonyi, and many others. He went on to write the first book on graph theory Theorie der endlichen und unendlichen Graphen in 1936. This marked the beginning of graph theory as its own branch of mathematics. Then in 1958, Claude Berge wrote the second book on graph theory, Théorie des Graphes et ses applications, following Kőnig.

After the occupation of Hungary by Nazi Germany, he worked to help persecuted mathematicians. On October 15, 1944, the National Socialist Arrow Cross Party took over the country. Days later on October 19, 1944, he committed suicide to evade persecution from the Nazis for being a Hungarian Jew.

== Accomplishments ==
1899 – Matematikai és Fizikai Lapok written while attending High School
1902 – First place in "Eötvös Loránd"
1907 – received his Doctorate Degree
1910 – promoted to "oberassistant"
1911 – promoted to "Privatdocent" in 1911 teaching nomography, analysis situs (later to be known as topology), set theory, real numbers and functions, and graph theory
1935 – gained full professorship at Technische Hochschule
1936 – he wrote the first book on graph theory, Theorie der endlichen und unendlichen Graphen

== Dénes König Prize ==
The Dénes König Prize is a prize established and given by the Society for Industrial and Applied Mathematics Activity Group on Discrete Mathematics to an early career researcher for outstanding research in an area of discrete mathematics. The first award was given in 2008, and it had been given biennially thereafter.

=== Past award recipients ===
Year	Winner
2008	Adam Wade Marcus
2010	Jacob Fox
2012	Zeev Dvir
2014	Wojciech Samotij
2016	Lutz Warnke
2018	Yufei Zhao
2020	Matthew Kwan
2022	Sarah Peluse
2024	Jinyoung Park and Huy Tuan Pham
2026	Ashwin Sah and Mehtaab Sawhney

== Bibliography ==
- Chartrand, Gary; Zhang, Ping (January 2012). A first course in graph theory. Mineola, N.Y.: Dover Publications. ISBN 9780486483689.
- Kőnig, Dénes (1936), Theorie der endlichen und unendlichen Graphen, Leipzig: Akademische Verlagsgesellschaft. Translated from German by Richard McCoart, Theory of finite and infinite graphs, Birkhäuser, 1990, ISBN 0-8176-3389-8.

== See also ==
- Kőnig's theorem (graph theory)
- Kőnig's theorem (set theory) is due to Dénes' father, Gyula Kőnig.
- Kőnig's lemma
- Labyrinth problem
