= Imre Kacskovics =

Hungarian immunologist

- Born: 23 September 1961 (age 65); Budapest, Hungary
- Citizenship: Hungarian
- Occupation: academic

Academic background
- Education: Eötvös Loránd University
- Alma mater: University of Veterinary Medicine Budapest; Budapest University of Technology and Economics; Eötvös Loránd University

Academic work
- Discipline: Immunology
- Institutions: Eötvös Loránd University

Imre Kacskovics (23 September 1961, Budapest) is a Hungarian immunologist and the current dean of the Faculty of Science of the Eötvös Loránd University.

== Life ==
He was born in 1961 in Budapest and he has been married with 3 children.

== Teaching career ==
He obtained a degree in veterinary in 1987 from the University of Veterinary Medicine Budapest. In 1991, he obtained a degree in nuclear technology and radiation from the Budapest University of Technology and Economics. In 1998, he obtained a Doctor of Philosophy from the University of Veterinary Medicine Budapest. His thesis was entitled The examination of the VH and CH immunoglobin genes of the pigs (in Hungarian: A sertés VH és CH immunglobulin génjeinek vizsgálata).

In 1999, he was a Visiting scholar at the Brandeis University, Massachusetts, United States.

In 2019, he was appointed as the Dean of the ELTE Faculty of Science.

== Research ==
During the COVID-19 pandemic in Hungary, he worked as a consultant for Hungarian prime minister Viktor Orbán. He was interviewed several times during the pandemic. In 2020, he was interviewed by Politico.

He was appointed as the Head of the Drug Development Consortium working under the auspices of the Ministry of Innovation and Technology. In October 2021, he said that the Hungarian COVID drug might be tested on animals in 2023.

On 13 September 2022, he delivered a speech at the MLE Citizen Science working group meeting in Budapest.

== Awards ==
- Bolyai János Research Fellowship from the Hungarian Academy of Sciences (1998),
- Széchenyi István Research Fellowship from the Ministry of Education of the Republic of Hungary (2001),
- Golden Medal of Szent István University (2006)
- "Innovative Researcher of the year 2010" from the Eötvös Loránd University

== Works ==
B Dudok, L Barna, M Ledri, SI Szabó, E Szabadits, B Pintér (2015). Cell-specific STORM super-resolution imaging reveals nanoscale organization of cannabinoid signaling. Nature neuroscience, 18(1), 75–86.

C Fekete, B Gereben, M Doleschall, JW Harney, JM Dora, AC Bianco (2004). Lipopolysaccharide induces type 2 iodothyronine deiodinase in the mediobasal hypothalamus: implications for the nonthyroidal illness syndrome. Endocrinology, 145(4), 1649–1655.
