= Fenyő =

Fenyő is a surname. Notable people with the surname include:

- David Fenyő, Swedish-American physicist and mass spectrometrist
- István Fenyő (1917–1987), Hungarian mathematician
- Iván Fenyő (born 1979), Hungarian actor
- Miksa Fenyő (1877–1972), Hungarian writer and politician
