= István Vincze (mathematician) =

Mathematician (1912–1999)

- Born: February 26, 1912
- Died: April 18, 1999 (aged 87)
- Education: Eötvös Loránd University
- Known for: Number theory Non-parametric statistics Empirical distribution Cramér–Rao inequality Information theory
- Awards: Hungarian State Prize (1966); Grauss Ehrenplakette (1978)
- Scientific career
- Fields: Mathematics
- Workplaces: Eötvös Loránd University

István Vincze (February 26, 1912 – April 18, 1999) was a Hungarian mathematician, known for his contributions to number theory, non-parametric statistics, empirical distribution, Cramér–Rao inequality, and information theory. Considered by many, as an expert in theoretical and applied statistics, he was the founder of the Mathematical Institute of the Hungarian Academy, and was the Head of the Statistics Department. He also held the post of professor at Faculty of Science of the Eötvös Loránd University. He wrote over 100 academic papers, authored 10 books, and was a speaker at several conferences, including the Berkeley Symposiums in 1960, 1965, and 1970. He received honors and awards like the Hungarian State Prize and Grauss Ehrenplakette in 1966 and 1978 respectively.

== Life ==
Born in Szeged, Hungary, he graduated from the University of Szeged in 1935.

Around 1950, he founded the Mathematical Institute of the Hungarian Academy, whose director was Alfréd Rényi.

Early in his career, he wrote papers with Paul Erdős, including On the approximation of convex, closed plane curves by multifocal ellipses.

Some of his books that were translated into English are Progress in statistics (1972), and Mathematical methods of statistical quality control (1974).

He participated in conferences and gave seminar talks in the United States, Canada, Argentina, Germany, and China.

He retired from academic teaching in 1980, and died in 1999.

== Academic publications ==
- Vincze, István; Erdős, Paul (1958). "Über die Annäherung geschlossener, konvexer Kurven. (On the approach of closed convex curves)" (PDF). Matematikai Lapok (9): 19–36.
- George Csordás; István Vincze (1992). "Convexity properties of power series with logarithmically S-concave coefficients". Analysis Mathematica. 18 (1): 3–13. doi:10.1007/BF02056656. S2CID 115386966.
- George Csordás; István Vincze (1992). "Своиства выпуклости степенных рьдов с лог арифмическиs-выпуклыми коёффицие нтами". Analysis Mathematica. 18 (1): 3–13. doi:10.1007/BF02056656. S2CID 115386966.
- George Csordas; Richard S. Varga; István Vincze (1990). "Jensen polynomials with applications to the Riemann ξ-Function". Journal of Mathematical Analysis and Applications. 153 (1): 112–135. doi:10.1016/0022-247X(90)90269-L.
- Madan Lal Puri; István Vincze (1990). "Measure of information and contiguity". Statistics & Probability Letters. 9 (3): 223–228. doi:10.1016/0167-7152(90)90060-K.
- E. Csáki; I. Vincze (1978). "On limiting distribution laws of statistics analogous to Pearson's chi-square". Statistics: A Journal of Theoretical and Applied Statistics. 9 (4): 531–548. doi:10.1080/02331887808801453.
- M. Folledo; I. Vincze (1976). "Some remarks to a paper by E. Csáki and G. Tusnády on the ballot theorem". Acta Mathematica Hungarica. 28 (1): 177–179. doi:10.1007/BF01902508. S2CID 122272404.
- Z. W. Birnbaum; I. Vincze (1973). "Limiting Distributions of Statistics Similar to Student's". Annals of Statistics. 1 (1973): 958–963. doi:10.1214/aos/1176342517.
- P. Revesz; I. Vincze (1972). "Alfréd Rényi, 1921–1970" (PDF). The Annals of Mathematical Statistics. 43 (6). doi:10.1214/aoms/1177690849.
- Vincze, István (1996). "Cramér–Rao type inequality and a problem of mixture of distributions". Tatra Mountains Mathematical Publications. 7: 237–245. Zbl 0920.62027.
- Vincze, István; Puri, Madan L. (1992). "The Neyman–Pearson probability ratio and information.". In Schach, S; Trenkler, G. (eds.). Data analysis and statistical inference. Bergisch Gladbach; Verlag Josef Eul. pp. 53–64. Zbl 0790.62011.
