= Virtual Globes Museum =

The Virtual Globes Museum (VGM) is an on-line museum founded and maintained at the Eötvös Loránd University's Department of Cartography and Geoinformatics. It's considered to be one of the largest projects related to globe digitization. Its primary purpose is to present the terrestrial and celestial globes made in or related to Hungary in a virtual exhibition, and to preserve the cultural heritage of globe making as a craft. The collection has grown from five at its opening in 2007 to one hundred globes as of August 2013.

The 3D models were originally embedded as VRML objects and viewing required an appropriate plugin installed in the browser. In the new version of the website VRML models were replaced by X3D models, using the X3DOM library for viewing.

Beside the interactively steerable/zoomable 3D model of each globe there is a background database with the most important information and a downloadable KMZ file for each globe, which can be opened in Google Earth as a new layer.
