= Enikő Kubinyi =

Hungarian biologist and researcher

Eniko Kubinyi
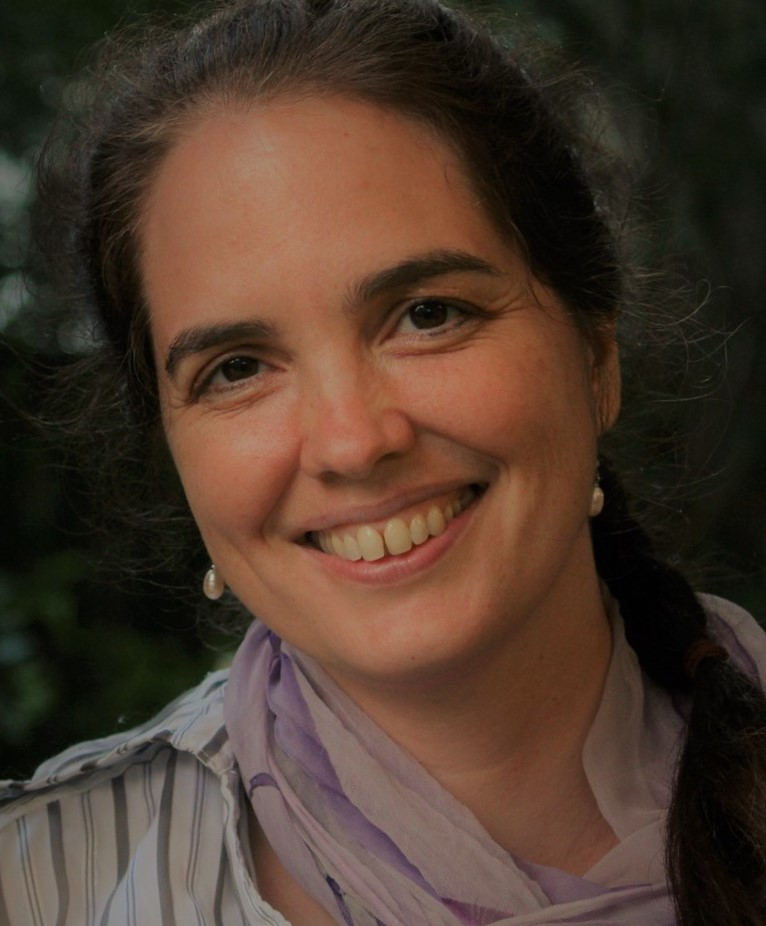
- Eniko Kubinyi
- Born: August 1, 1976 (age 48); Cegléd, Hungary
- Education: PhD in Ethology (2004); DSc in Biology, Hungarian Academy of Sciences (2021); Habilitation, Eötvös Loránd University (2022), full professor (ELTE, 2023)
- Awards: For Women in Science L'Oréal-UNESCO Hungary award (2018); Junior Prima award (2009), APA Frank A. Beach Comparative Psychology Award American Psychological Association (2004)
- Scientific career
- Fields: Ethologist
- Institutions: Department of Ethology Eötvös Loránd University

Eniko Kubinyi (born 1 August 1976) is a Hungarian biologist, professor and head of department at the Department of Ethology, ELTE Eotvos Lorand University, who studies dog behaviour, cognition, ageing, and the relationship between dogs and humans. She is the principal investigator of the Senior Family Dog Project, the MTA-ELTE Lendület/Momentum Companion Animal Research Group, and the Canine Brain and Tissue Bank.

In 2012, she appeared on the Horizon (BBC TV series) programme The Secret Life of the Dog, where she presented their research on hand-rearing wolves and comparing the behaviour of wolves and dogs. Kubinyi has received several awards for his work, including APA Comparative Psychology Award in 2004 and the L'Oréal-UNESCO Award For Women in Science in 2018. She is a fellow of the Young Academy of Europe and a founding member of the Hungarian Young Academy.

== Bibliography ==
=== Books ===
- Author of 10 chapters The Dog - A Natural History
