= Hungarian Food Safety Office =

The Hungarian Food Safety Office (HFSO) operated as the Hungarian partner institution of the European Food Safety Authority (EFSA) from 2003 to 2012 in conformity with the EU requirements. One of its priority was to assess the health risks derived from food and indirectly from feed, to liaise with international and Hungarian authorities, and to communicate with the public on food safety issues. From 2012, these tasks are performed by the National Food Chain Safety Office, which was established by the integration of the Central Agricultural Office and HFSO.

== Scientific risk assessment ==
One of the major responsibilities of HFSO was the scientific risk assessment relating to food safety, taking into account up-to-date scientific findings of recognised international institutions. The scientific risk assessment is based on identifying potential hazards, defining their characteristics, assessing their incidence and frequency and describing the risk. HFSO is responsible for assessing risks relating to concrete events, furthermore by analysing the data of annual official inspections concerning various agricultural, technological, environmental and biological contaminants, pesticide residues and natural toxic substances in raw and processed food. Based on the risk assessment, it forwards a proposal concerning the priority of inspections in the forthcoming period and participates in international risk assessment projects relating to individual chemical and microbiological contaminants.

== National and international relations ==
Fostering national and international relations was another important responsibility of HFSO. Before the establishment of the National Food Chain Safety Office, this institution had been the Hungarian partner organization of the European Food Safety Authority. In addition, HFSO was the designated contact point in the EU Rapid Alert System for Food and Feed (RASFF), the World Health Organization (WHO) Food Safety Emergency Network (INFOSAN Emergency) and FAO/WHO Codex Alimentarius.

== The role of communication ==
Food is a product that the vast majority comes into direct contact with day-by-day as a consumer, food maker, and customer. The third core function of HFSO was to fill the gap, in providing credible, up-to-date information for both experts and the general public concerning food safety, which also reflects the latest scientific achievements. HFSO aimed to raise consumer awareness among the general public, which will enable consumers to reject products and services that are dubious from a food hygiene and food safety point of view, and to become aware of and abide by fundamental principles.

== Regular publications ==
- HFSO Newsletters (published every two weeks; HU-EN bilingual publication)
- Food Safety Journal (published quarterly; table of contents in English language)

== Staff ==
HFSO worked with a small staff (18 people) under the supervision of the Ministry of Rural Development. All members of HFSO were public servants. Its general director was Mária Szeitzné Szabó.
