= Chief veterinary officer =

Chief veterinary officer (CVO) is the head of a veterinary authority (typically a national government service comprising veterinarians, other professionals and paraprofessionals). They have the responsibility and competence for ensuring or supervising the implementation in their nation of animal health and welfare measures, international veterinary certification and other standards and recommendations. The World Organization for Animal Health recognizes the notion of chief veterinary officers. The Council of the European Union also realizes the importance of the chief veterinary officers, and founded a preparatory body called Working Party of Chief Veterinary Officers. Typical responsibilities of a chief veterinary officer are to organize and operate a country's animal health and animal protection service and veterinary public health service, covering food chain safety, control of zoonoses, environmental contamination and role of animals in the society.

== Examples of chief veterinary officers ==
- Chief Veterinary Officer (Hungary)
- Chief Veterinary Officer (United Kingdom)
- Chief Veterinary Officer (Australia)
- Chief Veterinary Officer (United States), the Veterinary Services Deputy Administrator of the Animal and Plant Health Inspection Service, part of the United States Department of Agriculture
