= Gyula Kőnig =

Hungarian mathematician

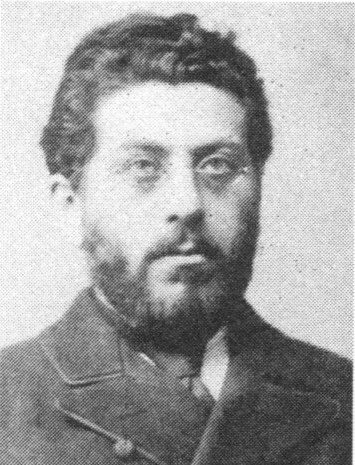
- Born: 16 December 1849; Győr, Kingdom of Hungary
- Died: 8 April 1913 (aged 63); Budapest, Austria-Hungary
- Education: University of Heidelberg
- Known for: König's paradox König's theorem (set theory); König's theorem (complex analysis)
- Children: Dénes Kőnig
- Scientific career
- Fields: Mathematics
- Doctoral advisor: Leo Königsberger

Gyula Kőnig (16 December 1849 – 8 April 1913) was a mathematician from Hungary. His mathematical publications in German appeared under the name Julius König. His son Dénes Kőnig was a graph theorist.

== Biography ==
Gyula Kőnig was active literarily and mathematically. He studied medicine in Vienna and, from 1868 on, in Heidelberg. After having worked, instructed by Hermann von Helmholtz, on electrical stimulation of nerves, he switched to mathematics.

He obtained his doctorate under the supervision of the mathematician Leo Königsberger. His thesis Zur Theorie der Modulargleichungen der elliptischen Functionen covers 24 pages. As a post-doc he completed his mathematical studies in Berlin attending lessons by Leopold Kronecker and Karl Weierstraß.

He then returned to Budapest, where he was appointed as a dozent at the university in 1871. He became a professor at the Teacher's College in Budapest in 1873 and, in the following year, was appointed professor at the Technical University of Budapest. He remained with the university for the rest of his life. He was on three occasions dean of the Engineering Faculty and also on three occasions was rector of the university. In 1889 he was elected a member of the Hungarian Academy of Sciences. Although of Jewish descent, Kőnig converted to Christianity soon after his election. In 1905 he retired but continued to give lessons on topics of his interest. His son Dénes also became a distinguished mathematician.

== Works ==
Kőnig worked in many mathematical fields. His work on polynomial ideals, discriminants and elimination theory can be considered as a link between Leopold Kronecker and David Hilbert as well as Emmy Noether. Later his ideas were simplified considerably, to the extent that today they are only of historical interest.

Kőnig already considered material influences on scientific thinking and the mechanisms which stand behind thinking.

The foundations of set theory are a formalization and legalization of facts which are taken from the internal view of our consciousness, such that our "scientific thinking" itself is an object of scientific thinking.

He is mostly remembered for his contributions to, and his opposition of, set theory.

== Kőnig and set theory ==
One of the greatest achievements of Georg Cantor was the construction of a one-to-one correspondence between the points of a square and the points of one of its edges by means of continued fractions. Kőnig found a simple method involving decimal numbers which had escaped Cantor.

In 1904, at the third International Congress of Mathematicians at Heidelberg, Kőnig gave a talk to disprove Cantor's continuum hypothesis. The announcement was a sensation and was widely reported by the press. All section meetings were cancelled so that everyone could hear his contribution.

Kőnig applied a theorem proved in the thesis of Hilbert's student Felix Bernstein; this theorem, however, was not as generally valid as Bernstein had claimed. Ernst Zermelo, the later editor of Cantor's collected works, found the error already the next day. In 1905 there appeared short notes by Bernstein, correcting his theorem, and Kőnig, withdrawing his claim.

Nevertheless, Kőnig continued his efforts to disprove parts of set theory. In 1905 he published a paper that claimed to prove that not all sets could be well-ordered.

It is easy to show that the finitely defined elements of the continuum form a subset of the continuum of cardinality $\aleph_0$. The reason is that such a definition must be given completely by a finite number of letters and punctuation marks, only a finite number of which is available.

This statement was doubted by Cantor in a letter to Hilbert in 1906:

Infinite definitions (which are not possible in finite time) are absurdities. If Kőnig's claim concerning the cardinality $\aleph_0$ of all finitely definable real numbers was correct, it would imply that the whole continuum of real numbers was countable; this is most certainly wrong. Therefore Kőnig's assumption must be in error. Am I wrong or am I right?

Cantor was wrong. Today Kőnig's assumption is generally accepted. Contrary to Cantor, presently the majority of mathematicians considers undefinable numbers not as absurdities. This assumption leads, according to Kőnig,

in a strangely simple way to the result that the continuum cannot get well-ordered. If we imagine the elements of the continuum as a well-ordered set, those elements which cannot be finitely defined form a subset of that well-ordered set which certainly contains elements of the continuum. Hence in this well-order there should be a first not finitely definable element, following upon all finitely definable numbers. This is impossible. This number has just been finitely defined by the last sentence. The assumption that the continuum could be well-ordered has led to a contradiction.

Kőnig's conclusion is not stringent. His argument does not rule out the possibility that the continuum can be well-ordered; rather, it rules out the conjunction of "the continuum can be well-ordered by a definition in language L" and "the property of being definable in language L is itself definable in language L". The latter is no longer generally held to be true. For an explanation compare Richard's paradox.

The last part of his life Kőnig spent working on his own approach to set theory, logic and arithmetic, which was published in 1914, one year after his death. When he died he had been working on the final chapter of the book.

== About Kőnig ==
At first Georg Cantor highly esteemed Kőnig. In a letter to Philip Jourdain in 1905 he wrote:

You certainly heard that Mr. Julius Kőnig of Budapest was led astray, by a theorem of Mr. Bernstein which in general is wrong, to give a talk at Heidelberg, on the international congress of mathematicians, opposing my theorem according to which every set, i.e., every consistent multitude can be assigned an aleph. Anyway, the positive contributions from Kőnig himself are well done.

Later on Cantor changed his attitude:

What Kronecker and his pupils as well as Gordan have said against set theory, what Kőnig, Poincaré, and Borel have written against it, soon will be recognized by all as a rubbish.

— Letter to Hilbert, 1912

Then it will show up that Poincaré's and Kőnig's attacks against set theory are nonsense.

— Letter to Schwarz, 1913

== Selected papers and books by Kőnig ==
- Zur Theorie der Modulargleichungen der elliptischen Functionen, Thesis, Heidelberg 1870.
- Ueber eine reale Abbildung der s.g. Nicht-Euclidischen Geometrie, Nachrichten von der Königl. Gesellschaft der Wissenschaften und der Georg-August-Universität zu Göttingen, No. 9 (1872) 157-164.
- Einleitung in die allgemeine Theorie der Algebraischen Groessen, Leipzig 1903.
- Zum Kontinuum-Problem , Mathematische Annalen 60 (1905) 177-180.
- Über die Grundlagen der Mengenlehre und das Kontinuumproblem, Mathematische Annalen 61 (1905) 156-160.
- Über die Grundlagen der Mengenlehre und das Kontinuumproblem (Zweite Mitteilung), Mathematische Annalen 63 (1907) 217-221.
- Neue Grundlagen der Logik, Arithmetik und Mengenlehre, Leipzig 1914.

== Literature and links ==
- Brockhaus: Die Enzyklopädie, 20th ed. vol. 12, Leipzig 1996, p. 148.
- W. Burau: Dictionary of Scientific Biography vol. 7, New York 1973, p. 444.
- H. Meschkowski, W. Nilson (eds.): Georg Cantor Briefe, Berlin 1991.
- W. Mückenheim: Die Mathematik des Unendlichen, Aachen 2006.
- B. Szénássy, History of Mathematics in Hungary until the 20th Century, Berlin 1992.
- O'Connor, John J.; Robertson, Edmund F., "Gyula Kőnig", MacTutor History of Mathematics Archive, University of St Andrews
- Niedersächsische Staats- und Universitätsbibliothek Göttingen, Digitalisierungszentrum,
- Universitätsbibliothek Heidelberg
- Media related to Gyula Kőnig at Wikimedia Commons
