= Tornyospálca =

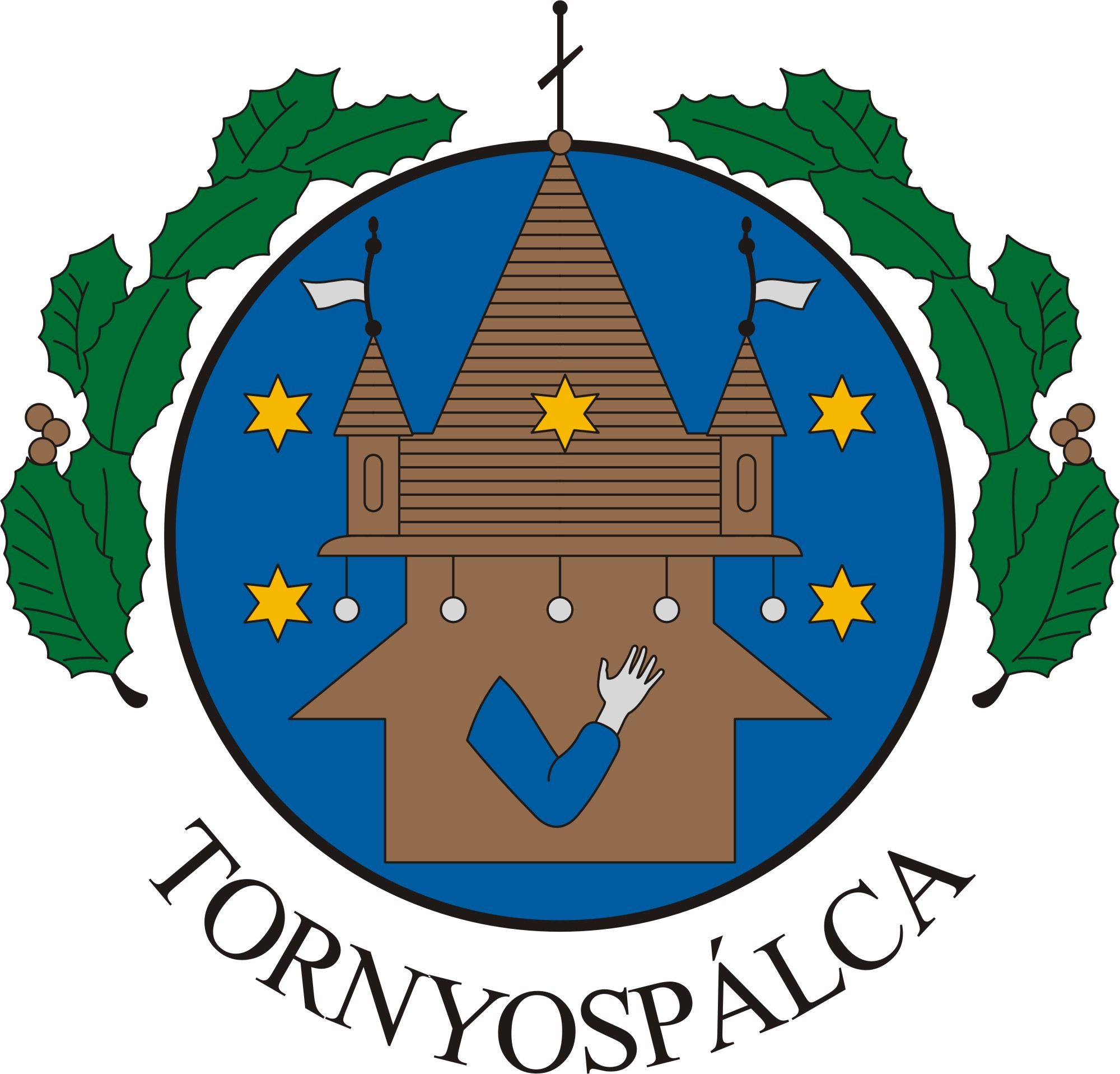
- Coat of arms

- Location of Tornyospálca in Hungary
- Coordinates: 48.27°N 22.18°E
- Country: Hungary
- Region: Northern Great Plain
- County: Szabolcs-Szatmár-Bereg

Area
  - Total: 43.65 km^{2} (16.85 sq mi)

Population (2015)
  - Total: 2,770
  - Density: 63.5/km^{2} (164/sq mi)
- Time zone: UTC+1 (CET)
  - Summer (DST): UTC+2 (CEST)
- Postal code: 4642
- Area code: +36 45
- Website: http://tornyospalca.hu/

Tornyospálca is a village in Szabolcs-Szatmár-Bereg county, in the Northern Great Plain region of eastern Hungary.

== Geography ==
It covers an area of 43.66 km^{2} (17 sq mi) and has a population of 2770 people (2015).

== History ==
The village was built in the form of a spindle around the former water level, encircling the predecessor of today's Reformed church in the middle. A number of Stone and Bronze Age finds have been unearthed on the outskirts of the settlement, such as the case tomb and the bronze sword from the area called “Sírkutgaz”.

His name was first mentioned in documents in 1212. In the Middle Ages, the Bánffy and then the Losonczi family owned a village of 15-20 serf plots. From the 18th century it was owned by the family of Count Forgách until the 20th century.

The village still has a living Kuruc tradition. II. Ferenc Rákóczi spent 9 days (January 3--11) in the village in 1706, many locals, whose names are also known, joined the regiment of Tamás Esze.

During the Revolution of 1848-49 and the War of Independence, a very significant number of soldiers and officers from Tornyospálca fought.

In World War I, 50 soldiers died heroic deaths. In 1923, the village erected the very first heroic monument of Felső-Szabolcs from public donations. At the end of World War II, the village mourned more than half a hundred heroic dead; the names of the deceased were engraved on the World War I memorial.

When the Soviet troops withdrew in 1991, a military loading base was established in Tornyospálca, where tactical equipment, transport vehicles and the building elements of the demolished Soviet barracks were transferred from the standard-gauge Hungarian trains to the wide-gauge Soviet wagons.

== Economy ==
The first cooperative was established in 1949 under the name Lenin. In 1961, Tornyospálca became a “production cooperative village” again, and the cooperative II. He took the name of Ferenc Rákóczi. From 1972, under the leadership of President Béla Agárdy, the cooperative achieved national success. Through its activities, it became a nationwide economy four times between 1976 and 1980. In 1992, in political overheating after the regime change, the cooperative was liquidated. Currently, locals farm several smaller and larger plots of land. Apple cultivation plays a major role, with nearly one and a half million apple trees on the outskirts of the village, but other fruits are also grown.
