= Mehtaab Sawhney =

American mathematician (born 1998)

- Born: Mehtaab Singh Sawhney; September 20, 1998 (age 28)
- Education: University of Pennsylvania (attended); Massachusetts Institute of Technology (BS, PhD)
- Awards: Morgan Prize (2021); Clay Research Fellowship (2024)
- Scientific career
- Fields: Mathematics
- Workplaces: MIT; Cambridge University; Columbia University; OpenAI
- Thesis: Probabilistic and analytic methods in combinatorics (2024)
- Doctoral advisor: Yufei Zhao

Mehtaab Sawhney (born September 20, 1998) is an American mathematician, specializing in combinatorics and number theory. He is an assistant professor at Columbia University.

== Early life and education ==
Sawhney grew up in Commack, New York. While attending Commack High School, Sawhney competed in the United States of America Mathematical Olympiad (USAMO), and participated in MIT PRIMES. In 2016, for his research in graph theory through MIT PRIMES, he was named a semifinalist in the Intel Science Talent Search and won an award at the International Science and Engineering Fair.

Sawhney attended the University of Pennsylvania for one year before transferring to the Massachusetts Institute of Technology (MIT), where he studied mathematics and computer science. He received an honorable mention in the Putnam Competition in 2016, 2018, and 2019. In 2020, he was awarded a Churchill Scholarship for further study in mathematics at Cambridge University, after which he returned to MIT for doctoral studies. With his frequent collaborator Ashwin Sah, he received an honorable mention for the Morgan Prize for undergraduate research in 2020, and won the Morgan Prize in 2021. He completed his PhD in 2024, supervised by Yufei Zhao.

== Career ==
At MIT, Sawhney was noted for his productive collaboration with fellow student Ashwin Sah in the fields of combinatorics and number theory. Sah and Sawhney each attended MIT for undergraduate and doctoral studies between 2017 and 2024. During that time, they co-authored more than 50 papers, on topics such as Ramsey theory, Steiner systems, subspace designs, and Szemerédi's theorem.

In 2024, Sawhney collaborated with Ben Green to prove that, for any n ≡ 0, 4 (mod 6), there are infinitely many prime numbers of the form p^{2} + nq^{2}, where p and q are themselves constrained to be prime numbers. The case n = 4 resolved a conjecture made by John Friedlander and Henryk Iwaniec in 2018.

Sawhney was awarded a Clay Research Fellowship in 2024, and a Packard Fellowship in 2025. He became a tenure-track assistant professor of mathematics at Columbia University in 2024. He went on leave from Columbia in 2026 to join the artificial intelligence company OpenAI as a mathematician.

In 2025, Sawhney and Mark Sellke used GPT-5, a large language model developed by OpenAI, to search the literature on several conjectures made by Paul Erdős in combinatorial number theory. In 2026, Sawhney and Sellke used GPT-5 to find a counterexample to Erdős's conjecture on unit distance graphs. GPT-5 provided a method to construct n points in the plane from which Ω(n^{1+ε}) pairs of points are unit distance apart, for some ε > 0. A team of mathematicians simplified the argument and computed an explicit lower bound for the exponent ε to be 6 × 10^{−38}; Will Sawin subsequently improved the exponent to ε ≈ 0.014. The construction is motivated by algebraic number theory, in particular the Golod–Shafarevich theorem, and involves high-dimensional lattices arising from CM-fields. Timothy Gowers hailed the result as "a milestone in AI mathematics".

In September 2026, Sawhney and Mark Sellke disclosed that they had utilized OpenAI's reasoning models (notably the Astra model) to resolve several long-standing open problems in pure mathematics. Among the most significant results was a breakthrough in high-dimensional sphere packing. Through a new connection between spherical codes and full-space packings utilizing representation theory, the models established a strict improvement over the 1970s upper bound from linear programming, achieving an asymptotic value of $\textstyle\sqrt{e/2\pi}^{(1 + o(1))d}$ (roughly $2^{-0.6044d}$).

Additionally, Sawhney and Sellke reported that the AI system successfully generated a 15-page proof confirming the existence of a non-sofic group, resolving a major open question in group theory. Discussing the impact of frontier AI on the field, Sawhney noted that the models exhibit reasoning traces similar to human mathematicians, including the ability to independently backtrack on failed approaches. He observed that as AI accelerates mathematical discovery, the primary bottleneck for human mathematicians is shifting from generating proofs to absorbing and contextualizing AI-generated mathematics.
