= László Egyed =

Geophysicist

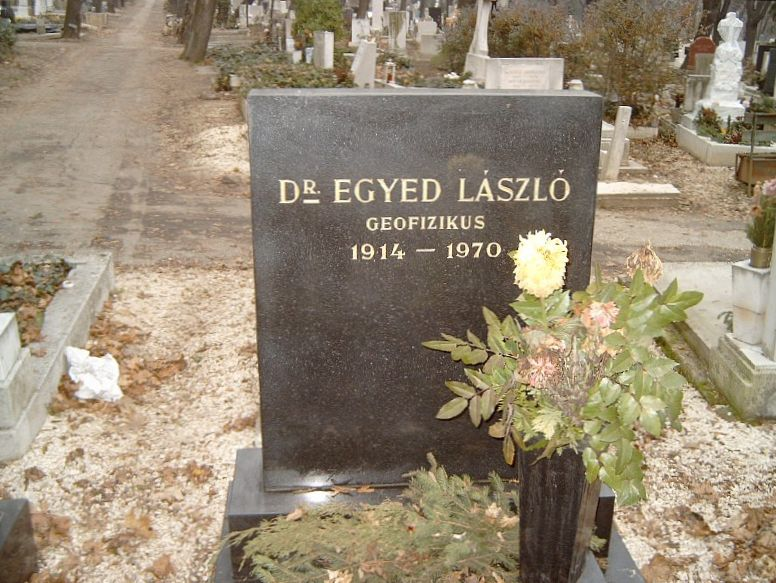
Wolf's Meadow Cemetery, Budapest

László Egyed (12 February 1914 – 11 July 1970) was a Hungarian geophysicist who published over 100 scientific articles. In 1956 he wrote the book Physics of the solid earth, which was reworked and republished in 1969.

Like Ott Christoph Hilgenberg, Samuel Warren Carey and Pascual Jordan, Egyed was a supporter of the expanding Earth theory, an alternative to plate tectonics. He calculated an increase of the Earth's radius by approximately 1 millimeter per year, or a total of 500 kilometers since the Cambrian period. On phenomenological grounds Egyed proposed a possible decrease of the gravitational constant in connection with phase transitions within the Earth. Although Egyed's hypotheses of phase transitions were confirmed, standard theoretical explanations today do not attribute this phenomenon to any expansion of the Earth.

The Association of Hungarian Geophysicists has honored Egyed by awarding the László Egyed medal every two years since 1986 "to recognize outstanding professional performance in the field of geophysics."
