= Emanuel Beke =

Hungarian mathematician

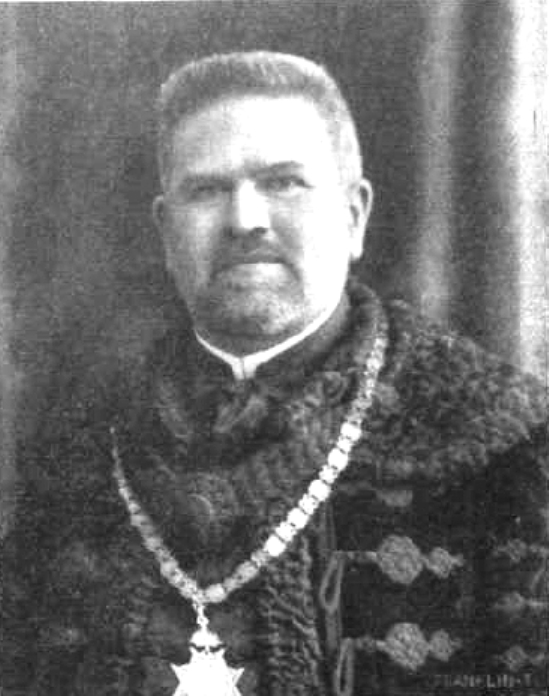
Manó Beke

Emanuel Beke (Beke Manó (in Hungarian), 24 April 1862, Pápa – 27 June 1946, Budapest) was a Hungarian mathematician, specializing in differential equations, determinants, and mathematical physics. He is known for reforming the teaching of mathematics in Hungary.

== Education and career ==
At the University of Budapest he received a mathematics-physics degree in 1883 and a doctorate in 1884.

He taught at a secondary school in Budapest until 1895, and spent the year 1892/93 in Göttingen with a scholarship. He became aware of the activities of Felix Klein concerning the reform of the teaching of mathematics, and after his return he became the leader of the reformers of teaching of mathematics in Hungary. In 1895 he started teaching at the Mintagimnázium in Budapest. In 1900 he was appointed professor at the University of Budapest.

In 1908 he was an Invited Speaker of the ICM in Rome. In 1914 he was elected a corresponding member of the Hungarian Academy of Sciences. In 1922 the official Council of the University of Budapest condemned his political activity, dismissed him from the University, and took away his membership in the Hungarian Academy of Sciences. After his dismissal he worked for a publishing firm.

Since 1950 the János Bolyai Mathematical Society has awarded the Máno Beke Commemorative Prize for teaching and popularization of mathematics.

== Selected publications ==
=== Articles ===
- "Die Irreducibilität der homogenen linearen Differentialgleichungen." Mathematische Annalen 45, no. 2 (1894): 278–294.
- "Die symmetrischen Functionen bei den linearen homogenen Differentialgleichungen." Mathematische Annalen 45, no. 2 (1894): 295–300.
- "Ueber die allgemeinste Differentialresolvente der homogenen linearen Differentialgleichungen." Mathematische Annalen 46, no. 4 (1895): 557–560.
- "Zur Gruppentheorie der homogenen linearen Differentialgleichungen." Mathematische Annalen 49, no. 3 (1897): 573–580.

=== Books ===
- Differenciál- és integrálszámítás I–II (1910–1916)
- Determinánsok (1915)
- Analytikai geometria (1926)
