= National Food Chain Safety Office =

National Food Chain Safety Office (Nébih/NFCSO) is the integrated food safety authority of Hungary, established on 15 March 2012.

== History ==
The roots of NFCSO are dated back to the first officially organized animal health service founded by the Animal Health Act VII/1888. The focus of the service has shifted from animal health to food security, then food safety according to the historical needs of Hungary. Sustainability issues and investigation of cases related to economic frauds in the food chain has appeared in the 21st century.

NFCSO is the direct legal successor of the Central Agricultural Office (CAO) and the Hungarian Food Safety Office. The CAO was the first food chain control authority in Hungary as the general legal successor of the Plant and Soil Protection Services, the Central Service of Plant and Soil Protection, the Animal Health and Food Control Stations, the National Institute for Agricultural Quality Control, the National Forestry Service, the Agricultural Budget Office, the National Wine Qualification Institute, the Institute of Veterinary Vaccine-, Medicine- and Feed Control, the National Animal Health Institute and the National Food Control Institute, which institutions had worked independently before 1 January 2007.

== Responsibilities ==
From 2012 NFCSO is responsible for the control of the entire food chain, including soil protection, agricultural production, forestry, food processing, retail and catering. Besides this, the most significant suppliers of the food chain are also registered by NFCSO (for instance private laboratories, input material suppliers). The National Food Chain Safety Office operates the food chain laboratory system and the national reference laboratory network.

Most of NFCSO's directorates pursue academic activities ranging from life sciences to social sciences. The institution operates two external university departments together with the University of Veterinary Medicine, Budapest and Hungarian University of Agriculture and Life Sciences, Institute of Food Science and Technology. Typical research areas include methodological development of laboratory investigations, risk assessment, food chain network analysis, food consumption patterns and risk perception of consumers. A significant share of the research projects are conducted in cooperation with international and national research institutions and universities.

The work of the directorates is coordinated by the president of NFCSO, also acting as deputy chief veterinary officer of Hungary. The activities of NFCSO are supervised by the Ministry of Agriculture and personally the chief veterinary officer of Hungary.

The basic principle of organizing the activities of NFCSO is food safety risk analysis as defined by the Codex Alimentarius Commission. Accordingly, besides food risk assessment and risk management, the Office also deals with food safety risk communication (both preventive and crisis communication) and also consumer related programmes, such as campaigns for conscious shopping, education programmes, responsible animal keeping, reducing antimicrobial resistance, prevention of food waste, prevention of forest fires.

Since 2016, NFCSO has been the organiser of the Hungarian national level food waste prevention programme, called Wasteless. The coordinator of the programme is the official representative of Hungary in the EU Platform on Food Losses and Food Waste, hosted by the EU Commission's Directorate-General for Health and Food Safety. Besides awareness raising and education, NFCSO also conducts research activities in this field.

== National and international relations ==
NFCSO is the official contact point to the European Food Safety Authority and the Rapid Alert System for Food and Feed, and the International Food Safety Authorities Network. Officially linked to the Ministry of Agriculture of Hungary and the European Commission's Directorate-General for Health and Food Safety (DG SANTE), the World Health Organization (WHO) and FAO/WHO Codex Alimentarius.
