= Zoárd Geőcze =

Hungarian mathematician

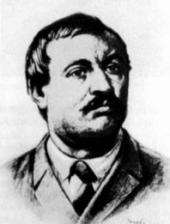
Zoárd Geőcze

Zoárd Geőcze de Szendrő (1873–1916) was a Hungarian mathematician famous for his theory of surfaces (Horváth 2005:219ff). He was born on 23 August 1873 in Budapest, Hungary and died on 26 November 1916 in Budapest.
