= Jenő Hunyady =

Hungarian mathematician (1838–1889)

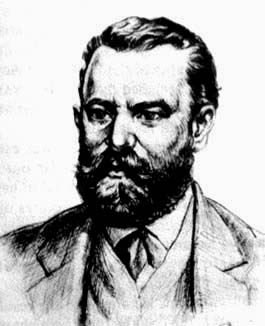
- Born: 28 April 1838; Pest, Kingdom of Hungary, Austrian Empire
- Died: 26 December 1889 (aged 51); Budapest, Austria-Hungary
- Known for: Hunyadi-Scholtz theorem

Jenő Hunyady (28 April 1838 in Pest – 26 December 1889 in Budapest) was a Hungarian mathematician noted for his work on conic sections and linear algebra, specifically on determinants. He received his Ph.D. in Göttingen (1864). He worked at the University of Technology of Budapest. He was elected a corresponding member (1867), member (1883) of the Hungarian Academy of Sciences. From 1885 he actively participated in the informal meetings of what became later the Mathematical and Physical Society of Hungary.
