= Veterinary public health =

Component of public health that focuses on the application of veterinary science

Veterinary public health (VPH) is a component of public health that focuses on the application of veterinary science to protect and improve the physical, mental and social well-being of humans. In several countries activities related to VPH are organized by the chief veterinary officer.

Conventionally veterinary public health as a topic covers the following areas:

== Food production and safety ==
It is desirable to consider food production as a chain, with animals reared on the farm (pre-harvest) then going for primary processing (harvest), secondary processing and distribution followed by final preparation (all post-harvest). This "farm to fork" concept can be easily described by considering a beef animal on a farm going to slaughter at the abattoir, then the hamburger production plant, then being distributed to a supermarket. The hamburger is then sold, taken home, stored, cooked and eaten.

Veterinary public health concerns all aspects of food production chain from controlling epidemic diseases that may impact on agriculture, to ensuring slaughter is conducted safely and humanely, to informing the public on safe ways to store and cook hamburgers.

== Zoonosis control ==
A zoonosis may be defined as any disease and/or infection which is naturally transmissible between animals and man.

They are a major public concern. Headlines on issues like avian influenza, BSE (mad cow disease) and salmonella of eggs have dominated the UK newspaper headlines for the last thirty years.

The picture in developed and developing countries may be quite different as far as zoonoses are concerned. In developed countries the consumer has very little contact with the live animal, limiting transmission from live animals to the general public. In addition food safety is extremely regulated. Despite this food borne disease is still a big problem in developed countries. In the EU in 2006, a total of 175,561 confirmed cases of campylobacteriosis were reported from 21 member states and reported cases will only represent a portion of the total.

Veterinary public health concerns the surveillance and control of zoonoses at many different levels be it via disease control programmes at farm level or wild animals or in the abattoir.

== Environmental contamination ==
Environmental pollutants that arise through the keeping and use of animals may include pollution of the air, land or water. It can arise through animal waste products as well as chemicals that may be used during production (e.g. insecticides, antibiotics, etc.).

In addition, practising vets will also produce potential environmental contaminants in the form of used needles, syringes, animal tissue and other clinical waste.

All of these materials have to be dealt with in a safe and controlled way. (See the section Environmental Contamination on WikiVet.)

== Role of animals in society ==
This aspect of veterinary public health deals with a number of ethical issues. Welfare of animals is an ever present issue regardless of the setting, whether it concerns pet animals, production animals or wild animals.

Where the line that defines acceptable and unacceptable welfare conditions lies is different for different individuals from different countries and cultures; however, it is common for minimum welfare standards to be defined in legislation.

Other issues may concern the use of animals in science, not just for experimentation, but the use of transgenic animals (an animals who has had its genome deliberately altered by genetic engineering techniques as opposed to selective breeding) and xenotransplantation (the transplantation of organs or tissues from one species to another) or the emergence of resistance to antimicrobial drugs due to their use in animals.
