= István Fenyő =

Hungarian mathematician

- Born: 5 March 1917; Budapest, Hungary
- Died: 28 July 1987 (aged 70); Budapest, Hungary
- Scientific career
- Fields: Mathematics
- Workplaces: Technical University of Budapest
- Thesis: On the theory of mean values (1945)
- Academic advisors: Lipót Fejér

István Fenyő (5 March 1917 – 28 July 1987) was a Hungarian mathematician, whose first name was also known as "Étienne, Stefan, Stephan or Stephen". He was best known for his publications of applied mathematics. He made significant contributions to analysis, algebra, geometry, integral equations and many other fields that pertain to his interests.

== Life and education ==
István Fenyő was born on 5 March 1917 in Budapest, Austria-Hungary into a family who were "cultured and interested in arts". He attended Pázmány Péter Catholic University in Budapest to study mathematics and physics; his advisor was Lipót Fejér who was the chair of mathematics "for 48 years from 1911 to 1959". After his graduation in 1939, which allowed him to teach those subjects at secondary school in Hungary, he continued his studies in chemistry and in 1942 earned the diploma. He then worked on his research publication "Über die 'Polynom-Kerne' der linearen Integralgleichungen" in 1943. During his doctorate, he developed his thesis "On the theory of mean values" (translated) in 1945.

=== Career ===
After Fenyő's education, he held his position as the lecturer at the Technical University of Budapest. In 1950, he was promoted to Extraordinary Professor of Mathematics. A decade later, he became the full Professor and then the first chair of mathematics and computer sciences. In 1968, he "left the Technical University of Budapest" and became the visiting professor in Germany "for several years". He was the first head of department until 1982.

== Personality ==
Based on Paganoni, Fenyő became fascinated and interested in sciences, humanities and arts since he was a child:

Everything attracted and excited his curiosity, his insatiable thirst for knowledge and his love of life. Mathematics, technics, art, music, really every expression of human creativity, fascinated him to the extent of desiring to master whatever subject he explored.

— L. Paganoni, Quoted in István Fenyö in memoriam

Fenyő was a passionate mathematician who readily engaged in conversation and showed a great affinity to work on his publications. He was able to speak in different languages; Paganoni describes his warm personality:

An extremely cordial man, full of drive and initiative, he was a source of constant inspiration to those who had the good fortune of knowing him. He spoke several languages fluently and therefore was able to communicate directly, sharing the richness of his mind, with people of varied linguistic background. A brilliant conversationalist, with his lively anecdotal style he was able to captivate all who had the pleasure of talking to him.

— L. Paganoni, Quoted in István Fenyö in memoriam

== Mathematical Work ==
Similar to Paul Erdős and Leonardo da Vinci, Fenyő was a prolific and brilliant publisher of mathematical work; during the late 1940s, he wrote numerous works; some in collaboration with mathematicians, like János Aczél, while he published others by himself. His two works, "Mathematics and the dialectial materialism" and "Les fondaments des mathématiques et la philosophie du matérialisme dialectique" were "delivered at the Tenth International Congress of Philosophy in Amsterdam" and "printed in the Proceedings" in 1949. His two-volume work, "Mathematics in electrical engineering", was published in 1964, and a decade later a Bulgarian translation of these volumes was published in 1977 and 1979. His interests in other sciences, including history of mathematics, philosophy of science and computer science, grew as he continued to publish his mathematical work.

=== Moderne mathematische Methoden in der Technik ===
Amongst his contributions, Fenyő was mainly successful for publishing three encyclopedic volumes of his textbook, "Moderne mathematische Methoden in der Technik" that involve classical analysis, geometry and algebra. The first volume includes set theory, Lebesgue and Stieltjies integrals, calculus and differential equations. Fenyő, along with his coauthors, proved Titchmarsh's theorem, which is important to integral theory. Unlike the first and the third volumes, the second contains "a mixture of topics", like linear algebra, graph theory and network theory, that are used in engineering and technology. The third volume involves integral equations and functional analysis that deal "with the theory of operators".

=== Integral equations ===
One of Fenyő's main interests was integral equations. In 1976, he wrote "Über die Wiener-Hopfsche Integralgleichung"; it focuses on the nature of the set of $L^2$ solutions of the Wiener-Hopf integral equation

$$g(x) - \int_0^{\infty} K(x - t)g(t)\,dt = f(x)$$

for the case "where $f(x)$ and $g(x)$ are permitted to be tempered distributions".

"Theorie und Praxis der linearen Integralgleichungen" was the six-volume work, written by H-W Stolle and Fenyő, that made significant contributions to integral equations. The first volume "is devoted to the theory of linear operators", and the second volume discusses the theory of integral equations "of the second kind". In the third volume, Fenyő explores the applications of integral transforms to mathematical physic and types of integral equations. Based on A E Heins' review of the three final volumes, those volumes focus on classical theory of linear integral equations that helped the "development of integral equations".

=== Functional equations ===
Fenyő also made a huge number of contributions to functional equations. One of his works, "The solution of a functional equation by Laplace transformation", focuses on proving two theorems that the functional equation has an analytic solution. He also discovered the "most general solution $f$" of the following functional equation:

$$f(x + y)(f(x) + f(y) - 1) = f(x)f(y)$$

In 1980's, he proved the theorem, using D.H. Hyers' propositions for solutions of functional equations. Fenyő, along with Gian Luigi Forti, also found the solutions to the following inhomogeneous Cauchy functional equation in a Banach space $E$:

$$f(x + y) - f(x) - f(y) = d(x,y)$$

where $x,y \in \mathbb{R}$ and $d:\mathbb{R} \times \mathbb{R} \rightarrow E$ is a bounded function. He was also known for discovering types of Jacobian functions that are related to functional equations.

In the late 1980s, he collaborated with Paganoni in discovering a rule of rational addition in functional equation. The amazing result of this work is that the nonzero solutions for the functional equation $f(\psi(x,y)) = f(x) + f(y)$ (where $\psi(x,y)$ is the unique rational nonintegers functions) are of the form

$$\psi(x,y) = \dfrac{xy(\beta \gamma - \alpha) + (x + y)\alpha \beta (1 - \gamma) + \alpha \beta(\alpha \gamma - \beta)}{xy(\gamma - 1) + (x + y)(\beta -  \alpha \gamma) + \alpha^2 \gamma - \beta^2}$$

where $\alpha, \beta, \gamma \in \mathbb{R}$ and $\gamma (\beta - \alpha) \neq 0$ with $f(x) = c\log|\gamma (x - \alpha)/(x - \beta)|$ (with the condition that $c \neq 0$). Another form of the solutions is

$$\psi(x,y) = \dfrac{(\alpha \lambda + 1)xy - \alpha^2 \gamma (x + y) + \alpha^2(\alpha \lambda - 1)}{\lambda xy - (\alpha \lambda - 1)(x + y) + \alpha(\alpha \lambda - 2)}$$

where $\alpha, \gamma \in \mathbb{R}$ with $f(x) = c(1/(\alpha - x) - \lambda)$ ($c \neq 0$).

=== Functional analysis ===
Fenyő also spent his time researching topics in functional analysis; his works include "An extension of a theorem of Tikhonov" and "a representation of the generalized inverse in Hilbert spaces". For the rest of his contributions, he worked on inverse of the linear operators in Hilbert spaces.

=== Differential equations ===
A few of Fenyő works also focus on differential equations. In "Uber die kleinsten Nullstellen von Losungen von Differentialgleichungen vierter Ordnung", he looks at the existence of zeroes of the solutions of the following fourth-order differential equation:

$$((ry'') + qy)' - py = 0$$

where $p,q,r \in C(a,\infty)$ and $r(x) > 0$ for any $x$. Using the identities found by Józef Maria Hoene-Wroński, he found that if this differential "equation has a solution with a zero of type 1", then it also has zeroes of type 2 and 4.

=== Hankel transformations and distributions ===
A few of Fenyő's works emphasize the concepts of Hankel transformations and distributions. His work, "On the generalized Hankel transformation", discusses that the transformation $h_n$ of integral order $n$, defined by $\langle h_n(u),s\psi\rangle = \langle u, th_n(\psi) \rangle$ where $u \in \mathcal{D}^+$ is a distribution and $\psi \in H_k$, is an algebraic isomorphism between the test function space $\mathcal{D}^+$ and a proper subspace $H_k$ of the test function space $\mathbb{Z}$. Fenyő also uses Fourier transforms of the functions for his other work "On the Hankel-transformation of Schwartz distributions", which focuses on four main theorems about Hankel-transformation $H_k$ that are used to establish "a new definition of the Hankel transformation of distributions".

=== Mathematical History ===
Fenyő also wrote historical math articles and papers throughout his life. Specifically, he wrote about Lipót Fejér and Frigyes Riesz in two of his works, "Some aspects of the relations between Italian and Hungarian mathematicians" and "L. Fejér et F. Riesz-100.Geburtstag". The first work covers the relationship of those two mathematicians "with Italian mathematicians during the inter-War period", whereas the second work includes the biographies of Fejér and Riesz.

== Publications ==
- The inversion of an algorithm (1947)
- On fields of forces in which centres of gravity can be defined with János Aczél (1948)
- Über die Theorie der Mittelwerte with János Aczél (1948)
- The notion of mean-values of functions (1949)
- Sur certaines classes de fonctionnelles with János Aczél and János Horváth (1949)
- Mathematics and the dialectial materialism (1948)
- Les fondaments des mathématiques et la philosophie du matérialisme dialectique (1949)
- Mathematics for chemists with G Alexits (1951)
- Integral equations - a book of problems (Hungarian) (1957)
- Mathematics in electrical engineering with Thomas Frey (1964)
- Moderne mathematische Methoden in der Technik (1967, 1971, 1980)
- Theorie und Praxis der linearen Integralgleichungen written with H-W Stolle (1982, 1983, 1983, 1984)
