= Eötvös Loránd University =

Public research university in Budapest, Hungary

- Eötvös Loránd Tudományegyetem (Hungarian)
- Latin: Universitas Scientiarum Budapestinensis De Rolando Eötvös Nominata
- Motto: Community of Knowledge
- Type: Public research university
- Established: 1635; 391 years ago
- Affiliations: Coimbra Group; Utrecht Network; UNICA; EUA; AUF
- Chancellor: Gyula Scheuer
- Rector: Lénárd Darázs
- Faculty: 1,800
- Students: c. 27,000
- Undergraduates: 16,017
- Postgraduates: 8,547
- Doctoral students: 1,442
- Location: Budapest, Hungary; 47°29′26″N 19°03′31″E
- Campus: Urban
- Sporting affiliations: Budapesti EAC
- Website: elte.hu/en

Eötvös Loránd University (Hungarian: Eötvös Loránd Tudományegyetem, ELTE, also known as University of Budapest) is a public research university based in Budapest, Hungary. Founded in 1635, it is the longest continuously operating university in the country.

The almost 30 thousand students at ELTE are organized into nine faculties, and into research institutes located throughout Budapest and on the scenic banks of the Danube. ELTE is affiliated with 7 Nobel laureates, as well as winners of the Wolf Prize, Fulkerson Prize and Abel Prize, the latest of which was Nobel Prize in Literature winner László Krasznahorkai in 2025.

The predecessor of Eötvös Loránd University was founded in 1635 by Cardinal Péter Pázmány in Nagyszombat, Kingdom of Hungary (today Trnava, Slovakia) as a Catholic university for teaching theology and philosophy. In 1770, the university was transferred to Buda, later to Pest. It was named Royal University of Pest until 1873, then University of Budapest until 1921, when it was renamed Royal Hungarian Pázmány Péter University after its founder Péter Pázmány. The Faculty of Science started its autonomous life in 1949, when the Faculty of Theology and the Faculty of Medicine was separated from the university (now Pázmány Péter Catholic University and Semmelweis University). The university received its current name in 1950, after one of its most well-known physicists, Baron Loránd Eötvös.

== History ==
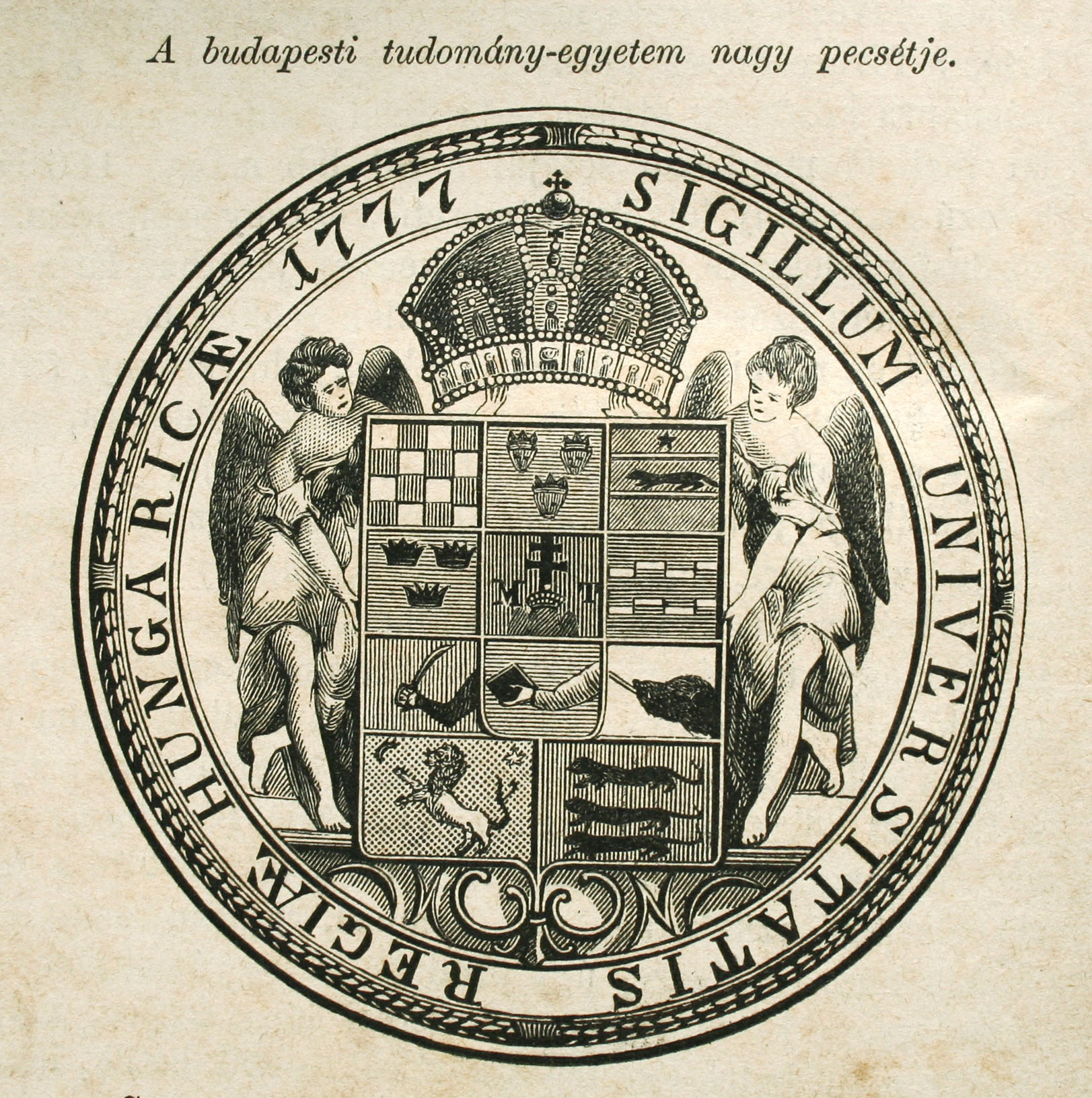
Seal of the university from 1880

The university was founded in 1635 in Nagyszombat, Kingdom of Hungary (today Trnava, Slovakia) by the archbishop and theologian Péter Pázmány. Leadership was given over to the Jesuits. Initially the university only had two faculties (Faculty of Arts and Faculty of Theology). The Faculty of Law was added in 1667 and the Faculty of Medicine was started in 1769. After the dissolution of the Jesuit order, the university was moved to Buda (today part of Budapest) in 1777 in accordance with the intention of the founder. The university moved to its present location in Pest (now also part of Budapest) in 1784. The language of education was Latin until 1844, when Hungarian was introduced as an exclusive official language. Women have been allowed to enroll since 1895.

Although several Hungarian universities opted for the new foundation model, Eötvös Loránd University remained state-owned.

== Academic profile ==
ELTE is Hungary's largest scientific establishment with 118 PhD programs at 17 doctoral schools, and also offers 38 bachelor's programs, 96 master's programs, and over 50 degree programs in foreign languages. The course credits awarded are transferable to universities in Europe through the Bologna process.

The nine faculties are (active faculties are in bold):

Faculty	Code	Founded	Defunct	Institutions	Educators	Students	Dean
Bárczi Gusztáv Faculty of Special Needs Education	FSNE	2000		5		2094	Gabriella Papp
Faculty of Economics	FE	2021	-	-	-	-	György Andor
Faculty of Humanities	FH	1635		18	589	6960	Dávid Bartus
Faculty of Education and Psychology	FEP	2003		8		3963	Anikó Zsolnai
Faculty of Informatics	FI	2003		4		3128	Tamás Kozsik
Faculty of Law	FL	1667		0		4172	Réka Somssich
Faculty of Medicine	FM	1769	1951	-	-	-	-
Faculty of Primary and Pre-School Education	FPPE	2000		0		1831	Éva Márkus
Faculty of Theology	FT	1635	1950	-	-	-	-
Faculty of Science	FS	1949		5		3815	Imre Kacskovics
Faculty of Social Sciences	FSS	2003		6		1762	Gábor Juhász
Faculty of Teachers' Training	FTT	1983	2003	-	-	-	

=== Reputation and rankings ===
University rankings

Global – Overall
- ARWU World: 501–600 (2023)
- QS World: =584 (2026)
- THE World: 801–1000 (2026)
- USNWR Global: =368 (2023)

In the 2013-14 QS World University Rankings, Eötvös Loránd University was ranked 551-600th. In 2018, according to the Times Higher Education World University Ranking, ELTE ranked between 601 and 800. Academic Ranking of World Universities ranked the university among the best 301-400 between 2010 and 2014.

== Campuses ==
ELTE has campuses at several places in Budapest:

- Egyetem tér in the 5th district (Faculty of Law, Faculty of Economics)
- "Trefort Garden" (Trefort-kert) in the 8th district (Faculty of Humanities)
- Lágymányos campus in the 11th district (Faculty of Science, Faculty of Social Sciences, Faculty of Informatics)
- Buildings in Kazinczy utca (7th district) and Izabella utca (6th district) (Faculty of Education and Psychology)
- Ecseri út in the 9th district (Bárczi Gusztáv Faculty of Special Needs Education)
- Kiss János altábornagy utca in the 12th district (Faculty of Primary and Pre-School Education)

Since 2017, ELTE has a campus named "Savaria University Centre" (Savaria Egyetemi Központ) in Szombathely (Savaria in Latin).

== Faculties ==
Location of faculties (FEP = Faculty of Education & Psychology, FI = Faculty of Informatics, FL = Faculty of Law, FSNE = Faculty of Special Needs Education, FSS = Faculty of Social Science)

Faculty	Abbreviation	Postcode	Address
Bárczi Gusztáv Faculty of Special Needs Education	FSNE	1097	3. Ecseri út
Faculty of Economics	FE	1088	7. Rákóczi út
Faculty of Education and Psychology	FEP	1075	23–27. Kazinczy utca
Faculty of Humanities	FH	1088	4. Múzeum krt.
Faculty of Informatics	FI	1117	1/C. Pázmány Péter sétány
Faculty of Law	FL	1053	1–3. Egyetem tér
Faculty of Primary and Pre-School Education	FPPE	1126	40. Kiss János altáb. utca
Faculty of Science	FS	1117	1/A. Pázmány Péter sétány
Faculty of Social Science	FSS	1117	1/A. Pázmány Péter sétány

== Library ==
The University Library and Archives was founded in 1561 and it is located in 6 Ferenciek tere. However, each faculty of the university has its own library. They are located in different parts of Budapest.

- Library of the Faculty of Humanities
- Library of the Faculty of Law
- Library of the Faculty of Science
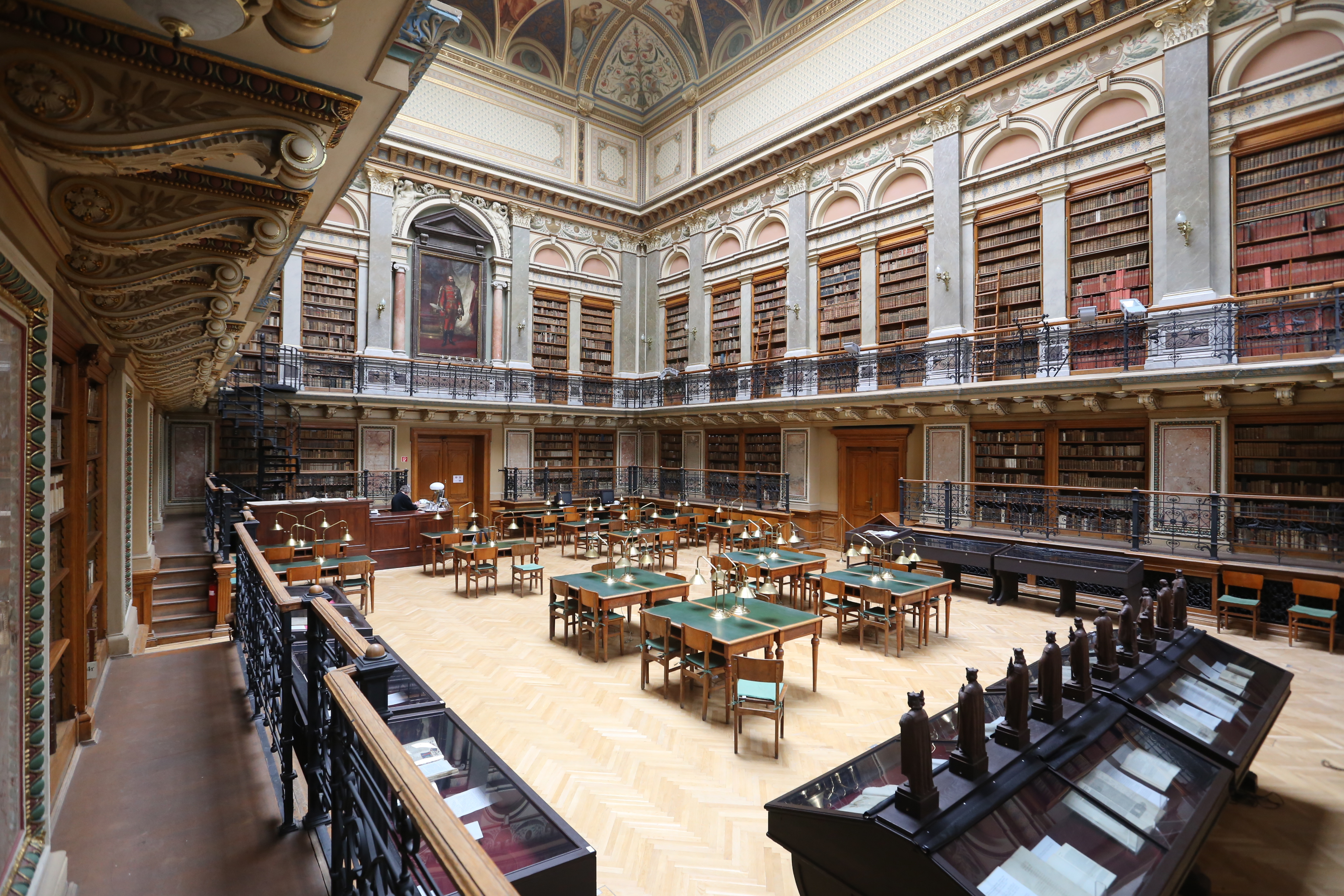

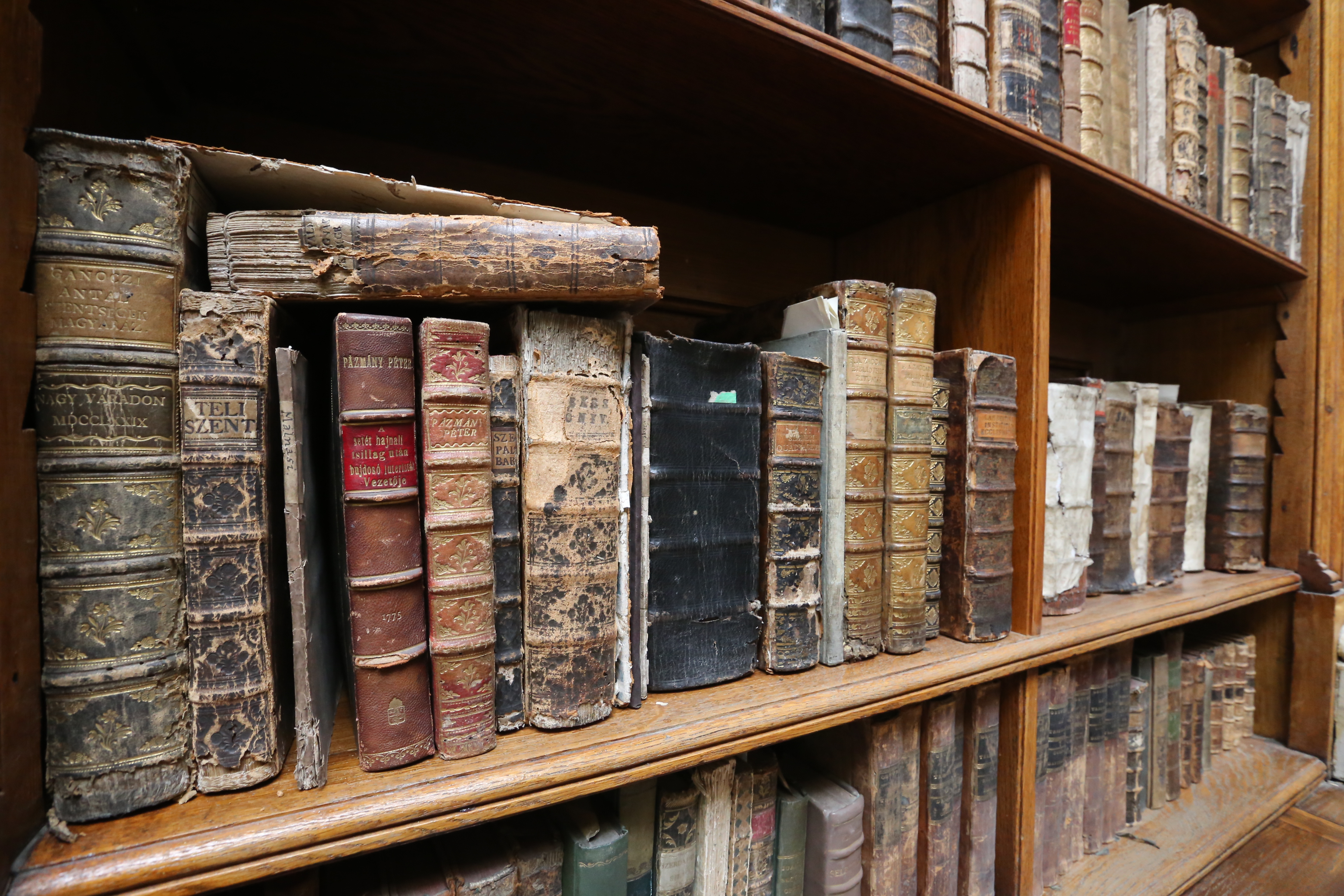

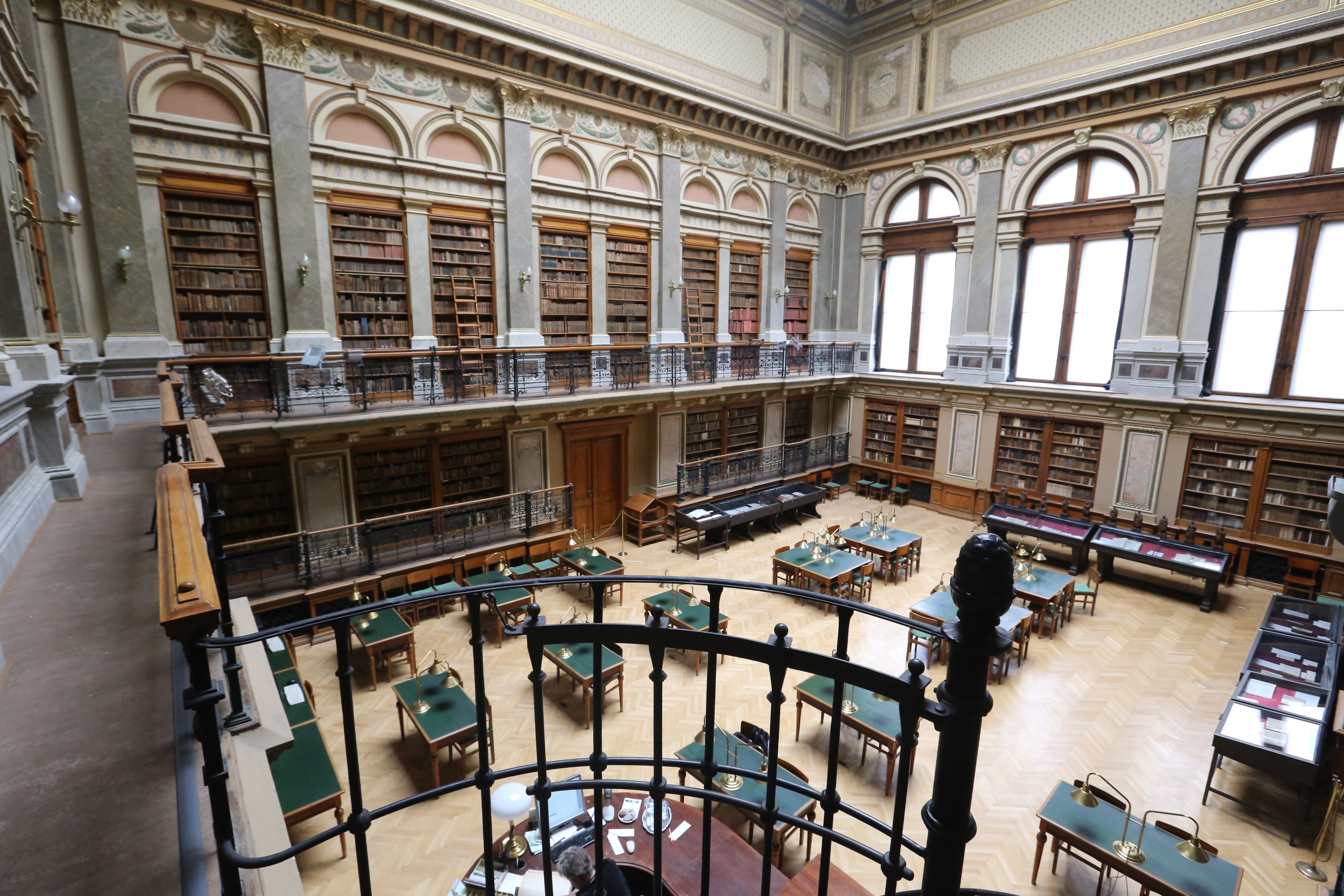

The library of Medieval Studies of the Central European University was located in the building of ELTE's Faculty of Humanities.

== Notable alumni ==
Nobel Prize laureates:

- Fülöp Lénárd, Nobel Prize in Physics (1905)
- Albert Szent-Györgyi, Nobel Prize in Physiology or Medicine (1937)
- György Hevesy, Nobel Prize in Chemistry (1943)
- György Békésy, Nobel Prize in Physiology or Medicine (1961)
- János Harsányi, Nobel Memorial Prize in Economic Sciences (1994)
- Ferenc Krausz, Nobel Prize in Physics (2023)
- László Krasznahorkai, Nobel Prize in Literature (2025)
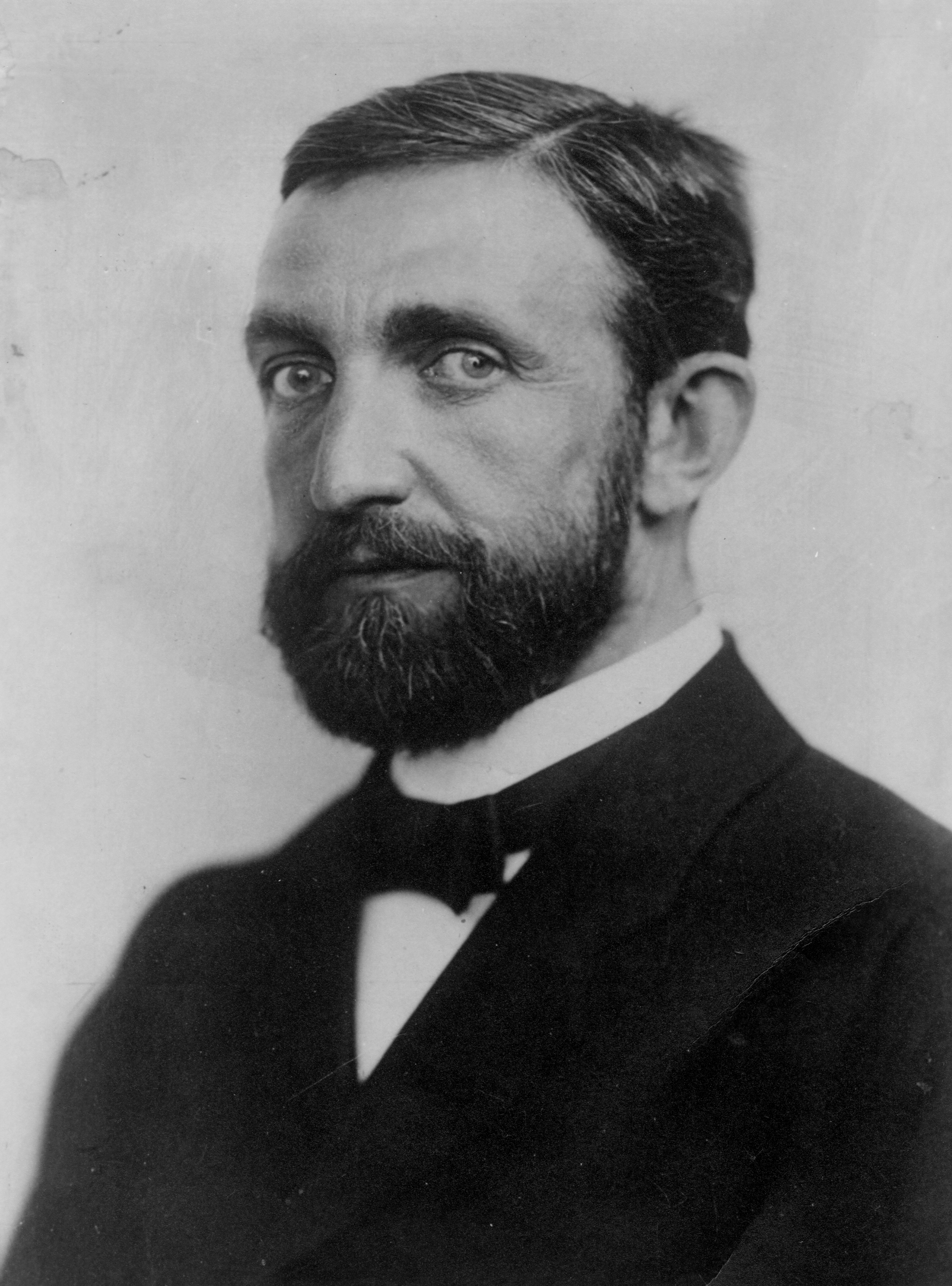
Fülöp Lénárd, physicist

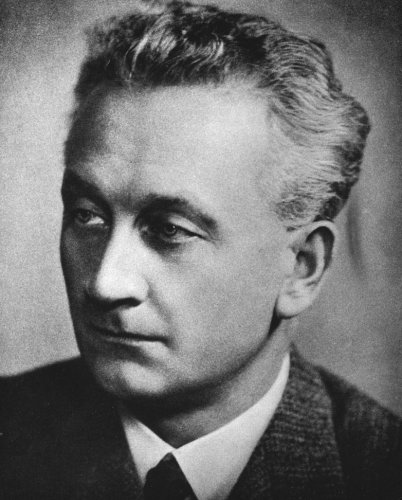
Albert Szent-Györgyi, biochemist

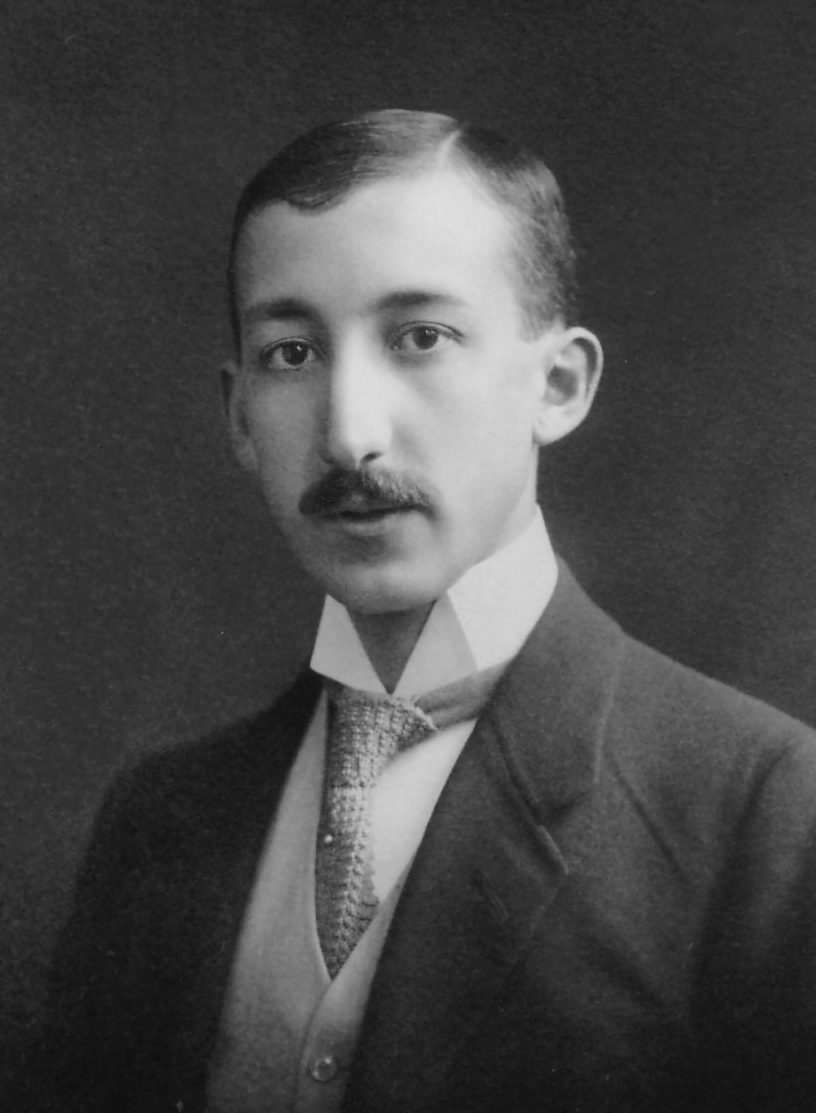
György Hevesy, chemist

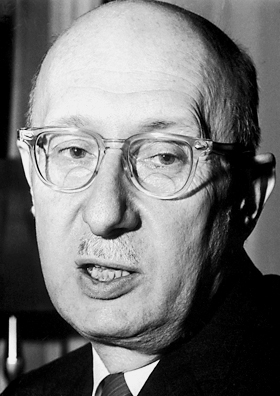
György Békésy, biophysicist

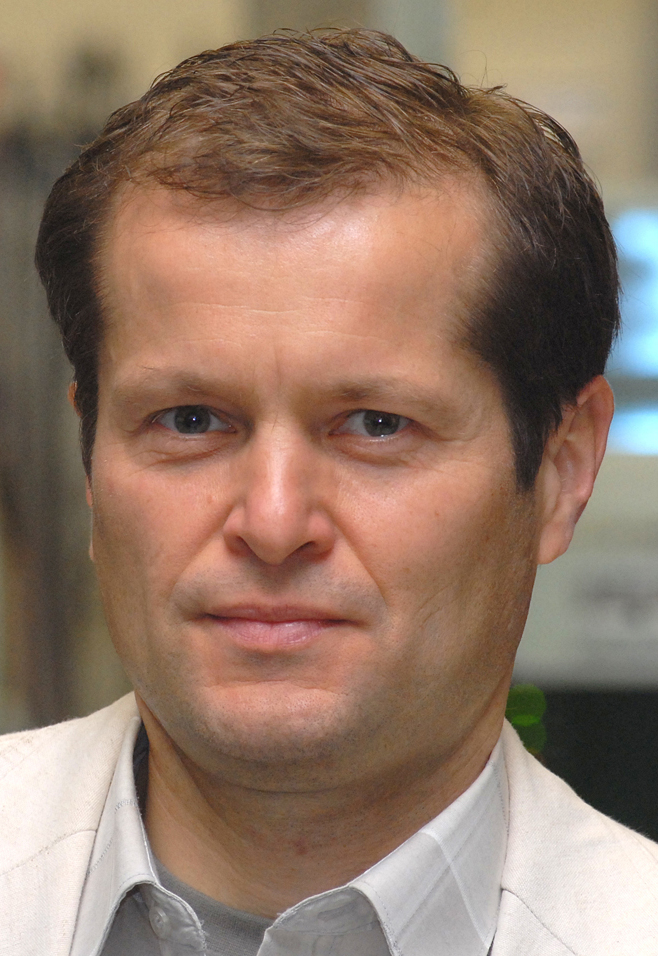
Ferenc Krausz, physicist

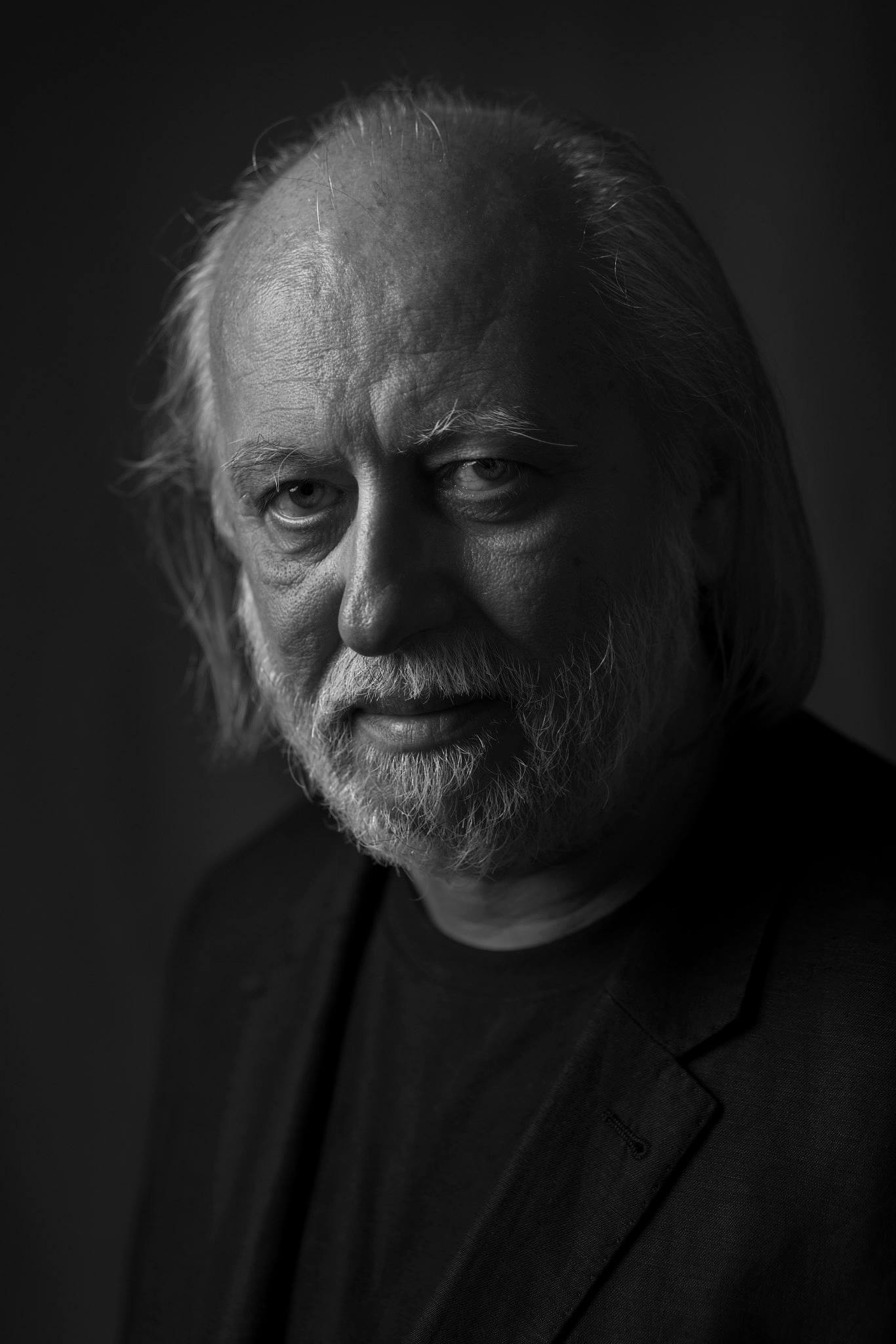
László Krasznahorkai, writer, novelist, screenwriter

Other notable alumni:

- Lili Hajdú Gimesné
- Dorottya Rédai
- Faculty of Humanities
- Faculty of Law
- Faculty of Science

== Sport ==
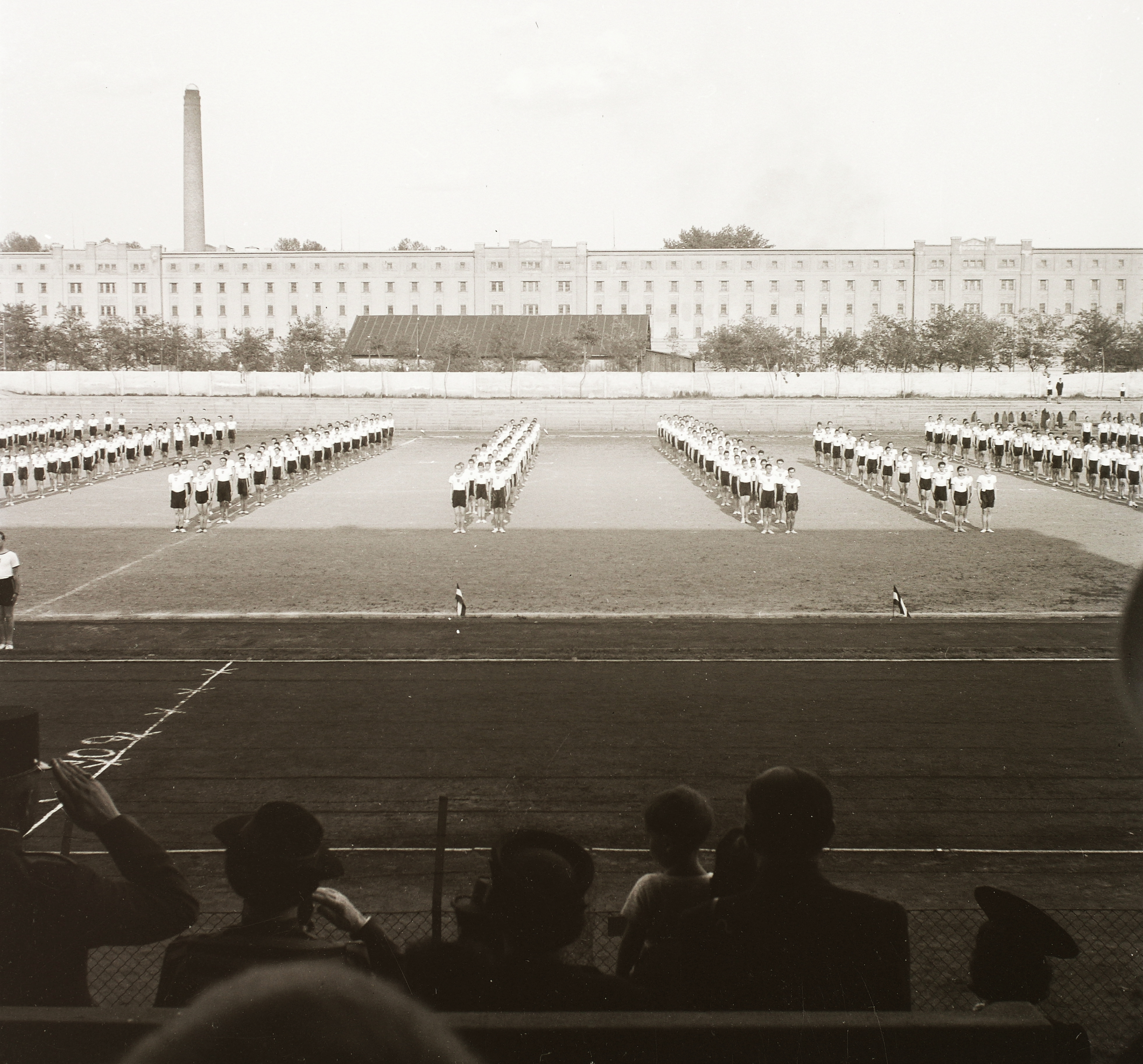
Stadium of the BEAC in Kőrösy József (Mező) street in 1940

The Eötvös Loránd University has its own sport club, Budapesti Egyetemi Atlétikai Club (English: Budapest University Athletic Club). The biggest achievement of the association football department of the club was qualifying for the 1924-25 Nemzeti Bajnokság I season. However, in the subsequent season (1925-26 Nemzeti Bajnokság I) the club was relegated to the Nemzeti Bajnokság II and has never since been able to qualify to the top flight.
https://www.beac.hu/

== See also ==
- Utrecht Network
- List of universities in Hungary
- Virtual Globes Museum
