= András =

András (Hungarian pronunciation: [ˈɒndraːʃ]) is a Hungarian masculine given name, the Hungarian form of Andrew. Notable people with the name include:

- András Ádám-Stolpa (1921–2010), Hungarian tennis player
- András Adorján (1950–2023), Hungarian writer
- András Ágoston (21st century), Hungarian Serbian politician
- András Andai (b. c. 1905–1960), Hungarian businessman in iron mining in Chile
- András Arató (born 1945), also known as Hide the Pain Harold, internet meme, stock photo model, and electrical engineer
- András Balczó (born 1938), Hungarian modern pentathlete
- András Balogi (1941–2000), Hungarian equestrian
- András Baronyi (1892-1944), Hungarian swimmer
- András Báthory (1562 or 1563–1599), Prince of Transylvania
- András Batiz (born 1975), Hungarian television presenter and government spokesman
- András Beck (1911-1985), Hungarian sculptor
- András Benkei (1923–1991), Hungarian politician
- András Bérczes (1909–1977), Hungarian footballer
- András Béres (1924–1993), Hungarian footballer
- András Bethlen (1847–1898), Hungarian politician
- András Biszok (born 1958), Romanian footballer
- András Bodnár (born 1942), Hungarian water polo player
- András Botos (born 1952), Hungarian boxer
- András Csáki (born 1981), Hungarian musician
- András Cser (born 1972), Hungarian linguist
- András Csókay (born 1956), Hungarian neurosurgeon
- András Csonka, multiple people
- András Debreceni (born 1989), Hungarian footballer
- András Dienes (born 1974), Hungarian footballer
- András Dlusztus (born 1988), Hungarian footballer
- András Doleschall (born 1959), Hungarian sports shooter
- András Domahidy (1920–2012), Hungarian Australian novelist
- András Dombai (born 1979), Hungarian footballer
- András Dőri (1930–2013), Hungarian boxer
- András Farkas (born 1992), Hungarian footballer
- András Fáy (1786-1864), Hungarian poet
- András Fejér (born 1955), Hungarian cellist
- András Fejes, multiple people
- András Fekete-Győr (born 1989), Hungarian politician
- András Feldmár, known as Andrew Feldmár (born 1940), Hungarian psychotherapist
- András Forgács (born 1985), Hungarian footballer
- András Frank (born 1949), Hungarian mathematician
- András Fricsay (1942–2024), Hungarian German actor
- András Gál (born 1989), Hungarian footballer
- András Gálfi (born 1973), Hungarian boxer
- András Gángó (born 1984), Hungarian footballer
- András Gárdos (born 1991), Hungarian footballer
- András Gerevich (born 1976), Hungarian poet
- András Gergely, multiple people
- András Máté Gömöri (born 1992), Hungarian actor, bodybuilder and powerlifter
- András Gosztonyi (born 1990), Hungarian footballer
- András Gosztonyi (sailor) (born 1933), Hungarian sailor
- András Gróf, later known as Andrew Grove (1936–2016), Hungarian-born American businessman
- András Gyárfás (born 1945), Hungarian mathematician
- András Gyöngyösi (born 1968), Hungarian water polo player
- András Gyürk (born 1972), Hungarian politician
- András Hadik (1710-1790), Austro-Hungarian soldier
- András Hajnal (1931–2016), Hungarian mathematician
- András Hajnal (diver) (born 1982), Hungarian diver
- András Hajós (born 1969), Hungarian sociologist, singer, songwriter, comedian
- András Haklits (born 1977), Hungarian Croatian hammer thrower
- András Harangvölgyi (1920–2010), Hungarian cross-country skier
- András Hargitay (born 1956), Hungarian swimmer
- András Hegedüs (1922-1999), Hungarian politician
- András Hegedűs (orienteer) (1950–2022), Hungarian orienteer
- András Herczeg (born 1956), Hungarian footballer
- András Hess (15th century), Hungarian chronicle
- András Horváth, multiple people
- András Hubik (21st century), Hungarian canoeist
- András Huszti (born 2001), Hungarian footballer
- András Jancsó (born 1996), Hungarian footballer
- András Kádár, known as Andrei Cadar (born 1937), Romanian equestrian
- Andras Kalman (1918–2007), Hungarian-British art dealer and tennis player
- András Kaj (born 1977), Hungarian footballer
- András Kállay-Saunders (born 1985), Hungarian American singer-songwriter
- András Katona (1938–2026), Hungarian water polo player
- András Keresztúri (born 1967), Hungarian footballer
- András Kern (born 1948), Hungarian actor
- András Kertész (born 1956), Hungarian linguist
- András Kőhalmi (born 1981), Hungarian footballer
- András Komjáti (born 1953), Hungarian football manager and player
- András Komm (born 1974), Hungarian sailor
- András Kormos (1952–2005), Hungarian rower
- András Kornai (born 1957), Hungarian mathematical linguist
- András Kovács, multiple people
- András Kulja (born 1989), Hungarian physician and politician
- András Kürthy (21st century), Hungarian opera director
- András Kuttik (1896-1970), Hungarian footballer
- András László, multiple people
- András Lelkes (born 1935), Hungarian gymnast
- András Lénárt (born 1998), Slovak footballer
- András Lévai, multiple people
- András Ligeti (1953–2021), Hungarian violinist
- András Littay (1884-1967), Hungarian general
- András Merész (born 1963), Hungarian water polo coach and player
- András Mészáros, multiple people
- András Mihály (1917–1993), Hungarian composer, conductor and music pedagogue
- András Németh, multiple people
- András Pál (born 1985), Hungarian footballer
- András Pályi (born 1943), Hungarian rower
- András Pándy (1927–2013), Hungarian Belgian serial killer
- András Paróczai (born 1956), Hungarian runner
- András Perczel (born 1959), Hungarian professor of chemistry at the Hungarian Academy of Sciences
- András Peter (21st century), Hungarian canoeist
- András Pető (1893–1967), Hungarian educator
- András Petőcz (born 1959), Hungarian writer
- András Pintér (born 1994), Hungarian footballer
- András Radó (born 1993), Hungarian footballer
- András Rajna (born 1960), Hungarian canoeist
- András Riedlmayer (1947–2026), American art historian
- András Róna-Tas (born 1931), Hungarian historian
- András Sallay (born 1953), Hungarian figure skater
- András Sánta (born 1985), Romanian footballer
- András Sárközy (born 1941), Hungarian mathematician
- András Schäfer (born 1999), Hungarian footballer
- András Schiff (born 1953), Hungarian British pianist
- András Schiffer (born 1971), Hungarian jurist
- András Selei (born 1985), Hungarian footballer
- András Serfőző (1950–2021), Hungarian politician
- András Sike (born 1965), Hungarian wrestler
- András Simon (born 1990), Hungarian footballer
- András Simonyi (born 1952), Hungarian ambassador
- András Stark (born 1949), Hungarian weightlifter
- András Sütő (1927-2006), Hungarian Romanian writer
- András Szalai (born 1998), Hungarian footballer
- András Szántó (born 1964), Hungarian American sociologist
- András Száraz (born 1966), Hungarian former figure skater and coach
- András Székely (1909-1943), Hungarian swimmer
- András Szente (1939–2012), Hungarian canoeist
- András Szőllősy (1921-2007), Hungarian composer
- András Telek (born 1970), Hungarian footballer
- András Tölcséres (born 1974), Hungarian footballer
- András Toma (1925-2004), Hungarian soldier
- András Tombor (born 1973), Hungarian Hungarian economist, entrepreneur and polo player
- András Törő (born 1940), Hungarian American canoeist
- András Törőcsik (1955–2022), Hungarian footballer
- András Tóth, multiple people
- András István Türke (born 1980), Hungarian historian, political scientist and diplomacy & security policy expert
- András Vági (born 1988), Hungarian footballer
- András Várhelyi (1953–2022), Hungarian journalist and politician
- András Vasy (born 1969), American-Hungarian mathematician
- András Veres (born 1959), Hungarian bishop and theologian
- András Vikár (born 1953), Hungarian architect
- András Visky (born 1957), Hungarian Romanian poet
- András Wanié (1911-1976), Hungarian swimmer
- András Winkler (born 2000), Hungarian footballer
- Gergely András Molnár (1897-2006), Austro-Hungarian soldier

== See also ==
- Andras (given name)
- Andor (disambiguation)
