= Andras (disambiguation) =

András is a masculine given name and a surname of Hungarian origin.

== People with the given name ==
- Andras (given name), a masculine given name

== People with the surname ==
- Bob Andras (1921–1982), Canadian politician
- Joseph Andras (born 1984), French writer
- Emily Andras, Canadian television producer and writer

== Other uses ==
- Andras (demon), a Great Marquis of Hell in the Ars Goetia
- Shani Andras, a fictional character in the anime Gundam SEED

== See also ==
- Andras Baive, a Sámi fairy tale
