= András István Türke =

Hungarian historian and political scientist (born 1980)

Türke András István
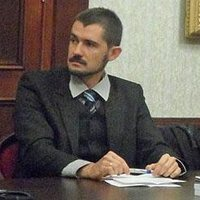
- Born: 8 October 1980 (age 45); Budapest, Hungary
- Education: Université Sorbonne Nouvelle Paris 3
- Scientific career
- Thesis: Lessons learned of the Common Foreign and Security Policy / European Security and Defence Policy (CFSP/ESDP) in a historical approach (2008)
- Doctoral advisor: Elisabeth du Réau
- Website: europavarietas.org/andras_turke

András István Türke is a Hungarian historian, political scientist and diplomacy & security policy expert. He is assistant professor at the University of Szeged, where he teaches contemporary history (European Union, Africa) and international relations. He is also Director of the Europa Varietas Institute (EUVI, Switzerland) where his focus is on European and African security issues. His prior teaching positions include the University of Pannonia (Veszprém, Hungary 2013–2015) and the National University of Public Service (Budapest, Hungary, 2015–2016). He is also a member of the CÉRIUM ROP (Réseau de Recherche sur les opérations de paix, University of Montreal, Canada).

Türke received his PhD in history of international relationships from the University of Sorbonne Nouvelle Paris III / École Doctorale 385 - Espace Européen Contemporain (2008) and his Habilitation from the University of Szeged is in progress (2018). An alumnus of the Institut des hautes études de défense nationale (IHEDN), he holds 4 M.A. degrees in history, political science, international relationships and European studies; he has also studied at Centre International de Formation Européenne (IEEI, former IEHEI) and speaks French, English and German fluently.

He was also former visiting fellow at European Union Institute for Security Studies (EUISS, 2006) as well as at the Assembly of the Western European Union - Defence Committee (AWEU, 2008–2011), associate and senior research fellow at the Center for Strategic and Defense Studies (CSDS / SVKK, under the Hungarian MoD 2008–2016), visiting and associate fellow at the Hungarian Institute of International Affairs (HIIA / MKI, 2007–2014).

== Publications, monographs and articles in English ==
- History of the Sahel, In Janos Besenyö (ed.) : NATO’s Regional Challenges - Terrorism and Counter-Terrorism in Sahel, Ankara: NATO CoE-DAT (Centre of Excellence - Defence Against Terrorism), 2025
- János Besenyő - A. I. Türke - Endre Szénási : WAGNER GROUP Private Military Company - Vol II. War in Ukraine 2013-2023, Warwick: Helion, 2025.
- János Besenyő - A. I. Türke - Endre Szénási : WAGNER GROUP Private Military Company - Vol I. Establishment, Purpose, Profile and Historic Relevance, Africa (2013-2023), Warwick: Helion, 2024.
- “Chasse gardée” or “Faubourg”? Politico-Military Interventions of France in the Sahel Region In: János Besenyő, Leonid Issaev & Andrey Korotayev (eds.) : Terrorism and Political Contention - New Perspectives on North Africa and the Sahel Region, London: Springer, 2024.
- The NATO-EU Relations : A strange marriage, In Anna Molnar - Zoltan Galik (ed.) Regional and bilateral relations of the EU, Budapest: Nemzeti Közszolgalati Egyetem. 2018.
- (ed.) From St-Malo to Lisbon - Selected documents of the Common Foreign & Security Policy in Europe (1998-2008), Paris: Europa Varietas Institute & Association Objectif Europe III - Sorbonne Nouvelle. 2013. (655 p.)
- (ed.) From Dunkirk to Amsterdam - Core Documents of the Common Foreign & Security Policy in Europe (1947-1997), Paris: Europa Varietas Institute & Association Objectif Europe III - Sorbonne Nouvelle. 2008. (280 p.)
- The Deficiencies, Mistakes and Contradictions of the New EU Foreign and Security Strategy - Evolution or Devolution? From the « Solana Paper » to the « Mogherini Paper », CERPESC Analyses 16/E/03/2016, pp. 1–87 (with annexes), Paris: CERPESC. 2016.
- The Evolution of European Diplomacy in the Balkan Region and the Reasons for the Dissolution of Yugoslavia, CERPESC Analyses, Special issue / 2016, pp. 1–16, Paris: CERPESC. 2016.

== Publications in French ==
- La Géopolitique des premières missions de l'Union européenne en Afrique, Paris: L'Harmattan. 2016(2), 2013. (256 p)
- La Politique européenne de sécurité et de défense (PESD) - Quel bilan après dix ans? Quelles nouvelles orientations? Paris: L'Harmattan. 2012. (296 p.)
- L`Union européenne et sa stratégie de rétablissement de la paix en Afrique, In András István Türke (ed.) Stabilité, intégration, coopération et développement - Szeged : 10-11 novembre 2016 - Actes du colloque portant sur les grandes questions de la stabilité et du développement du continent africain, pp. 67–86. Szeged: CUF - Centre Universitaire Francophone. 2017.
- Enjeux géopolitiques des premières missions de l’UE dans les Balkans occidentaux, In Vesselin Mintchev, Nikolay Nenovsky, Xavier Richer (ed) Western Balkans and the European Union - Lessons from past Enlargements, Challenges to Further Integrations, pp. 233–241. Sofia : University Publishing House “Stopanstvo”. 2015.
- Le nouveau nationalisme russe et son impact sur l`extrême-droite et le populisme est-européens, In Cahiers des études hongroises et finlandaises : L'Europe à contre-pied : idéologie populiste et extrémisme de droite en Europe centrale et orientale, pp. 213–226, Paris : CIEH Paris – Sorbonne Nouvelle Paris III. 2015.
- La structure de commandement des missions et des opérations de la PSDC - Vers un Quartier Général Européen?, CERPESC Analyses 12/E/02/2010, pp. 1–32, Paris: CERPESC. 2010.
- France - OTAN/NATO : Dans le contexte de la Défense européenne (1966-2009), CERPESC Analyses 09/E/01/2009, pp. 1–63, Paris: CERPESC. 2009.
- La crise albanaise en 1997 et l’Opération ALBA. Une occasion manquée ou le précurseur des opérations de la PESD dans les Balkans? In Christine Manigand, Elisabeth du Réau et Traian Sandu, eds. Frontières et sécurité de l'Europe, pp. 159–178. Paris: L'Harmattan. 2008.
- La Hongrie et la gestion des problèmes de sécurités et de stabilité à la périphérie de l'Union, In Temps, espaces, languages - La Hongrie à la croisée des disciplines, Tome II, Cahiers d'Études Hongroises 14-2/2007-2008, pp. 497–504. Paris: CIEH & L'Harmattan. 2008.
- Soudan - La complexité de la crise du Darfour CERPESC Analyses 08/AF/03/2008, pp. 1–68, Paris: CERPESC. 2008.
