= Andor Kertész =

Andor Kertész may refer to:

- André Kertész (1894–1985), born Andor Kertész, Hungarian-born American photographer
- Andor Kertész (1929–1974), Hungarian mathematician
