= Acta Humana =

Acta Humana may refer to:

- Acta Humana (ISSN 2082-4459), journal published by Maria Curie-Skłodowska University
- Acta Humana – Emberi Jogi Közlemények (ISSN 0866-6628), journal published by the National University of Public Service
