= Árpád Lajtos =

Hungarian military officer (1910–1986)

- Born: 22 November 1910; Pancsova, Austria-Hungary
- Died: 25 May 1986 (aged 75); Budapest, Hungary
- Military career
- Allegiance: Kingdom of Hungary; Hungarian People's Republic
- Service years: 1928 - 1949
- Rank: Major
- Conflicts: World War II

Árpád Lajtos de Szentmária (22 November 1910 – 25 May 1986) was a Hungarian military officer.

== His career before 1941 ==
He was born into a military family. In 1928 he enrolled at the Ludovica Academy and he was commissioned as a lieutenant on 20 August 1932. He was assigned to the 2nd Infantry regiment, in Budapest. In 1935 he was promoted to First lieutenant. In 1936 he enrolled to the Royal Hungarian Honved Staff Academy, which was the camouflaged military university of Hungary, hidden under the name of Regulation Review Course for Officers. In 1940, after graduation he was assigned to the 14th Infantry Brigade, stationed in Szeged, where he served as a trainee staff officer under the command of Marcel Stomm. From December 1940 he became the Staff Officer of the 17th Infantry Regiment, in Debrecen and soon, on 4 April 1941 he was promoted to Captain.

== In the Second World War and in captivity (1941–1948) ==
In 1941 he was promoted to Chief of Staff of the VI Corps, and in October 1942 he was assigned to the Staff of the 2nd Hungarian Army, at the Eastern Front. After the elimination of that field army at the Don by the Soviets, he served as a liaison officer at the Headquarters of the German Army Group South. When the remnants of the 2nd Army arrived back to Hungary, he was assigned to the 1st Department of the General Staff. From 1 July 1943 he was the Chief of Staff of the 3rd Hungarian Army and after that, until 8 June 1944, the Chief of Staff of the 24th Infantry Division at Uzhhorod. Between July and October 1944 he taught military tactics on the Staff Academy. After the German occupation of Hungary he promoted to Major and assigned to the newly founded Szent László Infantry Division, as a Chief of Staff. When the division sustained heavy damages in the fight around Budapest, he pulled it out from the front-line, against the orders of the German High Command and reorganised it in the area of the Lake Balaton. He handed over the town of Balatonfüred for the advancing Soviet forces without a fight, and he was taken to the Soviet Union as a prisoner of war. He returned from the captivity to Hungary in September 1948.

== After 1948 ==
He was released from duty and discharged from the officer corps by a special commission of the Ministry of Defence, in January 1949. He gave in a notice of appeal, but it was turned down in the second circuit in August. On 30 August 1949 he was arrested by the Military Political Department. He was sentenced to 7 years imprisonment for spying, and he was released from prison in August 1956. First he worked as a window-cleaner, after that as a translator. From 1961, he started to work on his memoirs about the tragedy of the 2nd Army for the state security services. First it was Sándor Sára, who was able to arrange an interview with him in his documentary series about the 2nd Army, in 1981. Árpád Lajtos' memoirs was published in 1989, three years after his death. Árpád Lajtos committed suicide on 25 May 1986, hours after the death of his wife, the famous Hungarian actress, Margit Dajka.

== His memoirs ==
- Lajtos Árpád őrnagy visszaemlékezései, Új Idő, 1989, 3. különszám. (Memoirs of Major Árpád Lantos, in Hungarian)
- Lajtos Árpád, Emlékezés a 2. magyar hadseregre, 1942–1943, edited by Szabó Péter, Szakály Sándor, Budapest, Zrínyi, 1989 (Sisak és cylinder), ISBN 963-326-928-8. (Remembering the 2nd Hungarian Army, 1942-1943.)
- Lajtos Árpád, Birodalmak árnyékában (In the Shadow of Empires), edited by Szigethy Gábor, Budapest, Holnap, 2000, ISBN 963-346-372-6.

=== Sources ===
- Kubinyi Ferenc, ...I did not accept the martial law; Memoirs of Endre Sárközi, former military judge (...És nem vállaltam a statáriumot: Dr. Sárközi Endre volt hadbíró ezredesnek, az igazságügy-miniszter egykori helyettesének emlékezései, 1949.)
- Hungarian Reference Encyclopedia (Magyar életrajzi lexikon)
- Szigethy Gábor, Életfogytiglan = Kortárs, 45(2000), 3.
