= Serfozo =

Serfozo is a surname. Notable people with the surname include:

- András Serfőző (1950–2021), Hungarian politician
- Gavril Serfözö (1926–2002), Romanian footballer
