= Andor Kertész (mathematician) =

Hungarian mathematician

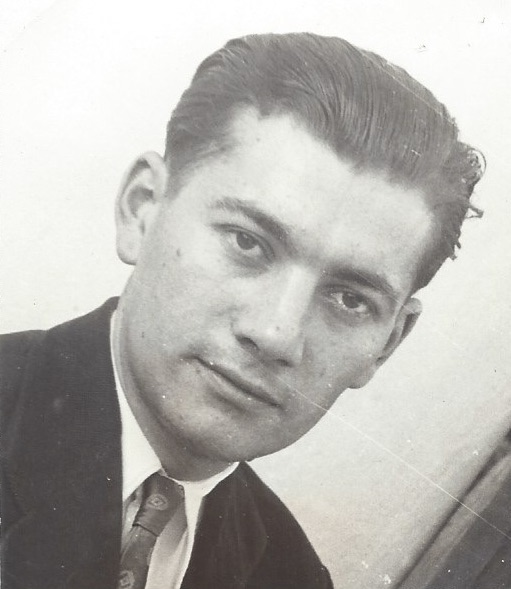
- Born: February 19, 1929; Gyula, Hungary
- Died: 3 April 1974 (aged 45); Budapest, Hungary
- Education: Lajos Kossuth University (KLTE), Debrecen
- Known for: Abelian group, module, ring, linear equation, cardinality
- Spouse: Ilona Tóth
- Children: András Kertész
- Awards: Grand Prize of the Hungarian Academy of Sciences (1968)
- Scientific career
- Fields: Mathematics; Algebra; Set theory
- Workplaces: Lajos Kossuth University

Andor Kertész (Hungarian: [ˈɒndor ˈkɛrteːs]; 19 February 1929 – 3 April 1974) was a Hungarian mathematician and professor of mathematics at the Lajos Kossuth University (KLTE), Debrecen. He is the father of linguist András Kertész.

== Biography and career ==
Kertész was born on 19 February 1929 in Gyula, Békés County, Hungary.

He graduated from the Roman Catholic Secondary Grammar School at Gyula in 1947.

He earned M.Sc. degrees at Lajos Kossuth University (KLTE), Debrecen in Mathematics, Physics, and Descriptive geometry in 1952.

During his academic years he also worked as a demonstrator and then as an intern at the Institute of Mathematics of the KLTE and he became an aspirant of professors Tibor Szele and László Rédei in Modern algebra in 1951 and since his graduation.

In 1954 he was appointed to an assistant professor at the Institute of Mathematics, KLTE.

He took the candidate (C.Sc.) of Mathematics degree in 1954 and was awarded Doctor of Science (D.Sc.) degree in mathematics in 1957.

From 1960 until 1968 he acted as head of the Department of Algebra and Number Theory, Institute of Mathematics but as an associate professor (docent, reader) just until 1963.

From 1961 until 1963, and from 1968 to 1971, he was a visiting professor at the Martin Luther University of Halle-Wittenberg, East Germany.

In 1962, he lectured in the United Kingdom and West Germany.

In 1963 he received the title of university (full) professor at the KLTE.

He was elected to full membership of the Academy of Sciences Leopoldina in 1968.

In his memory and honour they established the Andor Kertész County Memorial Competition in Mathematics in 1988.

His papers were issued in both national and international prestigious professional research scientific journals, and numerous scientific articles and books were published.

He presented his talks at several conferences and at the different science forums and he developed significant research and professional relationships in Western, Central and Eastern Europe.

He died on 3 April 1974 in Budapest due to chronic and serious illness.

== Achievements ==
His three main fields of interest are in Algebra: theory of Abelian groups, theory of Modules and theory of Rings. He was also interested in the history of mathematics.

He revealed the direct sum of modules and developed the general theory of linear equations.

He also made big and important discoveries about Radicals of Rings.

He dealt with the problems of cardinality in set theory.

During his visiting professorship in Halle, East Germany he contributed to the discovery of the mathematical achievements of Georg Cantor, too.

He was the important scholar of the Debrecen algebraic school founded by Tibor Szele.

At the Martin Luther University of Halle-Wittenberg he had a great role in the establishment of the Modern algebraic school.

== Family ==
His father, Lajos Kertész (1899–1974) was a teacher of music. His mother was Mária Nyíri. He had three siblings. Andor Kertész's wife was Ilona Tóth, teacher of history and geography. They had two children, a daughter, physician Gabriella Kertész and a son, linguist András Kertész.

== Committee memberships ==
- Academy of Sciences Leopoldina, member
- Publicationes Mathematicae Debrecen, member of the editorial board
- Mathematical Reviews, editor
- German Mathematical Society, member

== Awards and honors ==
- Grand Prize of the Hungarian Academy of Sciences (1968)
- Bronze Medal of Martin Luther University of Halle-Wittenberg (1971)

== Selected works ==
=== Papers ===
- Kertész, Andor: On the groups every subgroup of which is a direct summand, Publicationes Mathematicae 2, Debrecen, 74–75, 1951.
- Kertész, Andor–Szele, Tibor (1951). "On abelian groups every multiple of which is a direct summand : To Professor Reinhold Baer on his 50th birthday". Acta Scientiarum Mathematicarum. 14. Szeged: 157–166.
- Kertész, Andor: On the decomposibility of abelian p-groups into the direct sum of cyclic groups, Acta Mathematica Academiae Scientiarum Hungaricae 3, 121–126, 1952.
- Kertész, Andor–Szele, Tibor: On the smallest distance of two lines in 3-space, Publicationes Mathematicae 2, Debrecen, 308–309, 1952.
- Kertész, Andor: On fully decomposible abelian torsion groups, Acta Mathematica Academiae Scientiarum Hungaricae 3, 225–232, 1952.
- Kertész, Andor: Systems of equations over modules : To Professor Alexander Kurosh on hit 50th birthday. Acta scientiarum mathematicarum, (18) 3–4. pp. 207–234. (1957)
- Kertész, Andor: On independent sets of elements in algebra : To Professor L. Rédei on his 60th birthday. Acta scientiarum mathematicarum, (21) 3–4. pp. 260–269. (1960)
- Kertész, Andor: On multimodules, Archiv der Mathematik 13, 267–274, 1962.
- Kertész, Andor: A new proof of Litoff's theorem, Acta Mathematica Academiae Scientiarum Hungaricae 23, 1–3, 1972.

=== Books ===
- Kertész, Andor: Vorlesungen über Artinsche Ringe, Akadémiai Kiadó, Budapest; Teubner Verlag, Leipzig, 1968.
- Kertész, Andor: Einführung in die transfinite Algebra, Akadémiai Kiadó, Budapest, 1975. ISBN 963-05-0382-4
- Kertész, Andor–Manfred Stern: Georg Cantor 1845–1918, Schöpfer der Mengenlehre, Halle, 1983.
- Kertész, Andor: Lectures on Artian Rings, Akadémiai Kiadó, Budapest, 1987.

== Bibliography ==
- Huynh, Dinh Van, In memory of Professor Andor Kertész, in K Richter (ed.), Erinnerungen an Andor Kertész (1929–1974). Georg Cantor Heft, Sonderheft (Georg-Cantor-Vereinigung der Freunde und Förderer von Mathematik und Informatik an der Martin-Luther-Universität Halle-Wittenberg. E V, Halle/Saale, 2010), 35–36.
