= Cheshire Championships =

Tennis tournament held in England

Defunct tennis tournament
- Tour: ILTF
- Founded: 1923; 102 years ago
- Abolished: 1968; 57 years ago
- Location: Cheshire, England
- Surface: Grass

The Cheshire Championships a men's and women's grass court tennis tournament established by the Cheshire Lawn Tennis Association in July 1923, as the Cheshire County Lawn Tennis Championships. The tournament ran as part of the ILTF independent tour until 1968.

== History ==
The Cheshire Lawn Tennis Association was founded in 1890. In March 1923 it established its first Cheshire County Lawn Tennis Championships. In 1938 it became known simply as the Cheshire Championships. Former winners of the men's singles title included Andras Kalman, Geoff Masters and Darrell Shaw. The tournament ran as part of the ILTF senior men's tour until 1968.

The Cheshire County Championships are still being staged today.
