= Acta Linguistica Academica =

- Discipline: linguistics
- Language: English
- Edited by: András Cser

Publication details
- Former name(s): Acta Linguistica Hungarica; Acta Linguistica Academiae Scientiarum Hungaricae
- History: 1951–present
- Publisher: Akadémiai Kiadó (Hungary)
- Frequency: Quarterly
- Impact factor: 0.690 (2021)

Standard abbreviations
- ISO 4: Acta Linguist. Acad.

Indexing
- ISSN: 2559-8201 (print); 2560-1016 (web)

Links
- Journal homepage

Acta Linguistica Academica is a quarterly peer-reviewed academic journal published by Akadémiai Kiadó (Budapest, Hungary). It covers research on all aspects of linguistics, including socio- and psycholinguistics, neurolinguistics, discourse analysis, the philosophy of language, language typology, and formal semantics. It was formerly published as Acta Linguistica Hungarica and Acta Linguistica Academiae Scientiarum Hungaricae, obtaining its current name in 2017. The editor-in-chief is András Cser (Pázmány Péter Catholic University). The journal was established in 1951.

== Abstracting and indexing ==
The journal is abstracted and indexed in:

- Arts and Humanities Citation Index
- Bibliographie Linguistique/Linguistic Bibliography
- International Bibliographies IBZ and IBR
- Linguistics Abstracts
- Linguistics and Language Behaviour Abstracts
- MLA International Bibliography
- Scopus
- Social Sciences Citation Index

According to the Journal Citation Reports, the journal has a 2021 impact factor of 0.690, ranking it 145 out of 194 journals in the category "Linguistics".
