= Publicationes Mathematicae Debrecen =

- Discipline: Mathematics
- Language: English

Standard abbreviations
- ISO 4: Publ. Math. Debr.
- MathSciNet: Publ. Math. Debrecen

Indexing
- ISSN: 0033-3883 (print); 2064-2849 (web)

Links
- Journal homepage

Publicationes Mathematicae Debrecen is a Hungarian mathematical journal, edited, and published in Debrecen, at the Mathematical Institute of the University of Debrecen. It was founded by Alfréd Rényi, Tibor Szele, and Ottó Varga in 1949. The current editor-in-chief is György Gát.
