= András Horváth =

András Horváth may refer to:

- András Horváth (footballer, born 1980), Hungarian footballer
- András Horváth (footballer, born 1988), Hungarian footballer
- András Horváth (ice hockey) (born 1976), Hungarian ice hockey player
- András Tibor Horváth (born 1964), Hungarian politician
