= Ludovica Academy =

Former officer training institute in Hungary

Coordinates: 47°28′54″N 19°5′8″E

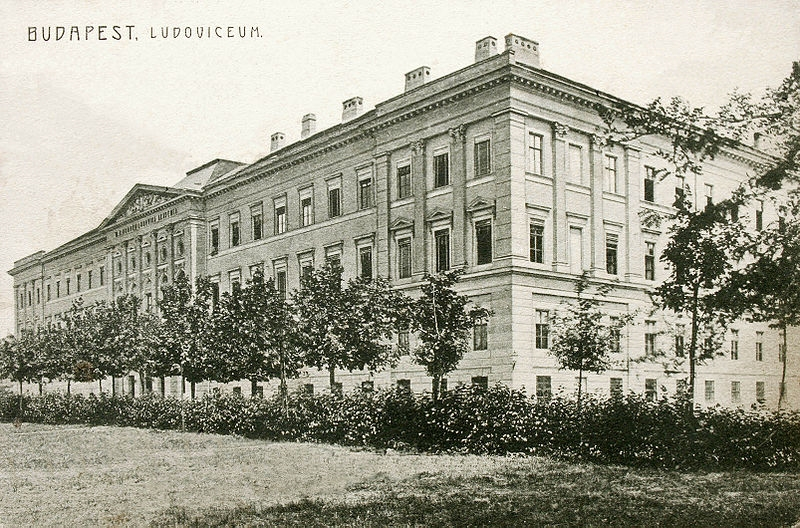
Main building of Ludovica Military Academy (1913)

Flag of the Ludovica Military Academy (1901)

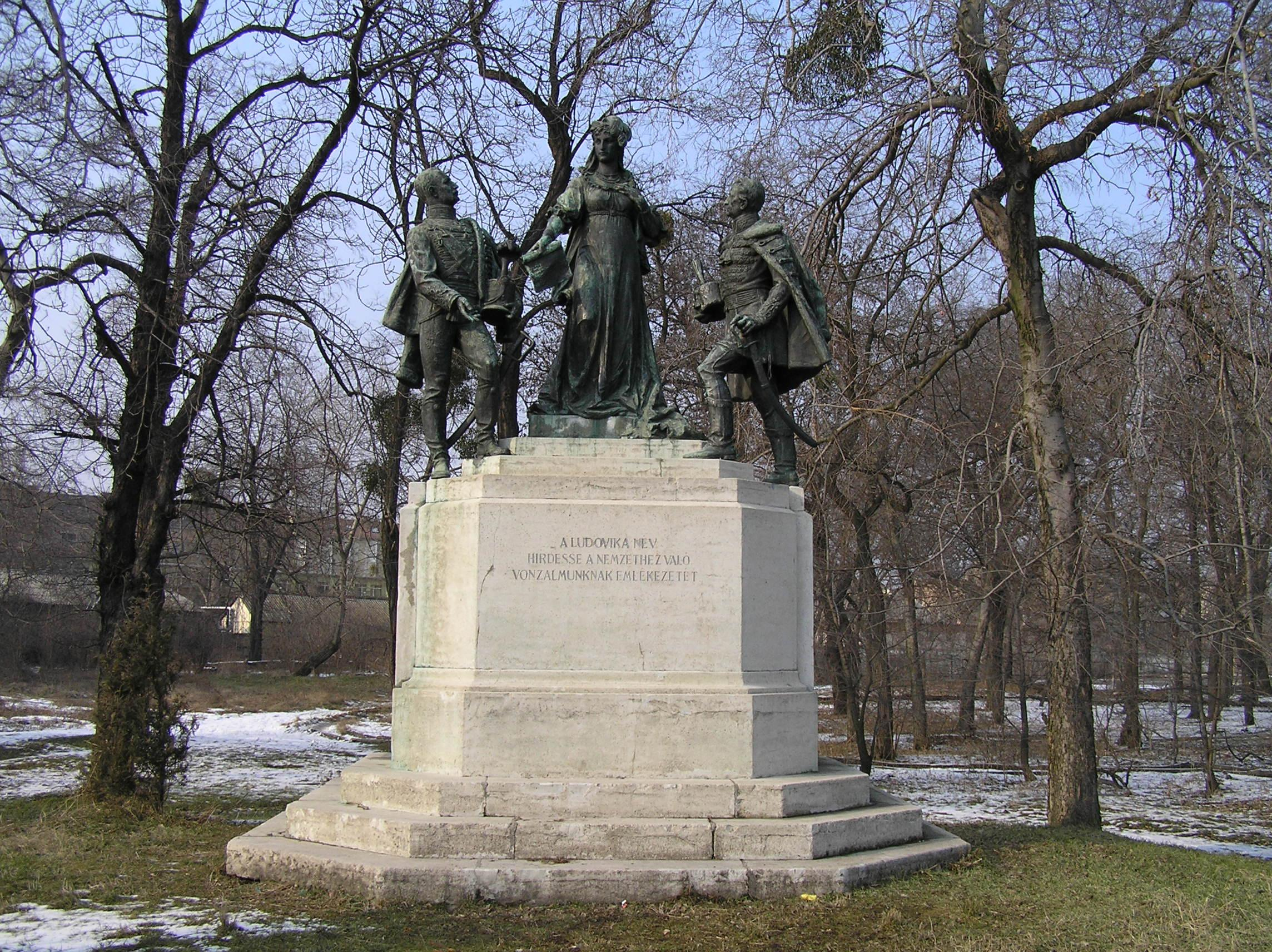
The inscription on the base of the sculpture, located behind the academy, reads: The Ludovica name proclaims the memory of our devotion to the nation

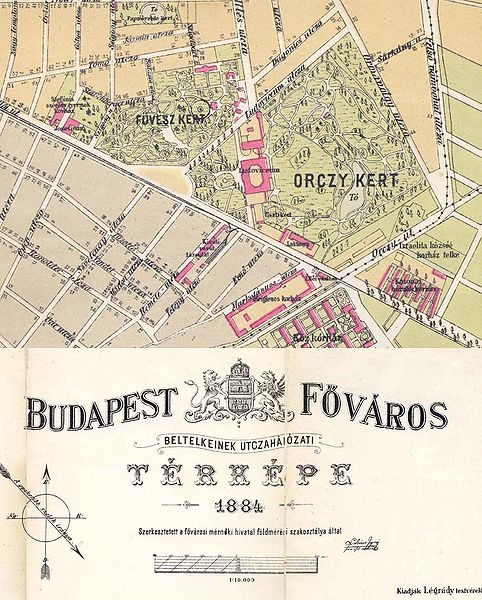
Map of the academy and the Orczy gardens (1884)

The Royal Hungarian Ludovica Military Academy (Hungarian: Magyar Királyi Honvéd Ludovika Akadémia, Latin: Ludoviceum, German: Ludovika-Akademie), shortened to Ludovica or Ludovica Academy, was Hungary's officer cadets training institute prior to 1945. The main edifice of the academy was erected in 1836 at the Ludovica Garden, in Budapest's centrally located VIIIth district. The building was designed by Mihály Pollack in the classical style.

== Mission ==
The academy combined the functions of an advanced Military High School level preparatory school, a military academy on the level of United States Military Academy at West Point, and an advanced college to facilitate assignments as junior staff officers to the Austro-Hungarian General Staff.

The high school provided volunteers of pre-conscription age, between the ages of 14 and 17, the opportunity to join the Royal Hungarian Honvéd as cadets or junior officers, depending on academic excellence. Ninety students per year were accepted where, 34 students were financed by private foundation grants, 10 students received free tuition provided by the Government, 23 students paid the full annual tuition of 600 Forints, and 23 paid half tuition per annum.

The officers training course required four years to complete, and the interdependence of functions fulfilled several needs of the Defense Forces. It provided a well trained officer corps, a training ground for instructional opportunities for officers, and finally, advanced military training to match the academic level of the Theresian Military Academy in Wiener Neustadt, Austria.

The parallel curriculum, and the matched level of quality, between the two schools guaranteed that the majority of officers of the Hungarian Defense forces were selected from the Ludovica Academy.

From the beginning of the final school year, some subjects, of both practical and theoretical nature, were taught in German, and qualified graduates received dual commissions as officers in both forces. This was especially important for the combined Hussar Corps, because this arrangement provided for, in a cycle of 2 to 3 years, a fresh assignment of Hungarian-speaking officers to command Hungarian-speaking troops.

== History ==
The academy was established at the 1808 National Assembly session. It was named after Maria Ludovika of Austria-Este the Royal Princess and the third wife of Ferenc I King of Hungary, who contributed 50,000 Forint for its upkeep from the funds of the Honours list proclaimed at the Coronation.

With additional public donations and patriotic contributions like that of Count János Buttler, who personally contributed 12,000 Forints, a substantial amount was collected, and the foundation stone was laid by Archduke Joseph, Palatine of Hungary (Hungarian: József nádor) in 1831.

The government did everything in its power to prevent the academy's establishment, and the contributed funds were diverted to other projects. The National Assembly of 1832-36 forbade the language of instruction to be in Hungarian, and this policy was re-introduced, and adhered to, after the Revolt of 1848.

Its existence, reorganization and regulation was enshrined in the 1872 XVI article of law to function as the Royal Hungarian Ludovica Military Defense Academy, and it opened its doors on November 21, 1872.

Academic accreditation, with the required level of curriculum, was introduced in 1897 during the government of Prime Minister Baron Dezső Bánffy. Several well-known military officers served as instructors at the academy, with General Henrik Werth, who, as of 1926, served as the commanding officer.

After World War II, the Communist regime left the academy building, like the Buda Castle, in their damaged condition. The horse riding school building housed the Alfa cinema, which, in the early 1990s, was completely destroyed by fire.

The thoroughly damaged main building was used by the faculty of Natural Sciences of Eötvös Loránd University. Today, the rebuilt southern wing houses the Raoul Wallenberg School of Social Sciences and the greatly expanded underground areas, linking the renovated covered riding school and the partially rebuilt main building, providing home for The Hungarian Museum of Natural History.

As the heir of Ludovica Academy, on May 15, 2009, the Miklos Zrinyi National Defense University celebrated the first 100 days of the merged institutes for advanced military curricula.

The celebrations were held in the Orzcy Garden located behind the main edifice and the programs were attended by the Army's choir with the participation of the citizens of the Józsefváros district.

== Legacy ==
The Ludovika University of Public Service has been operating in the main building of Ludovika since 2012. The Ludovika University of Public Service is the successor of the Royal Hungarian Ludovika Military Academy, the highest-level institution of Hungarian military higher education, and aims to preserve and carry forward its legacy.

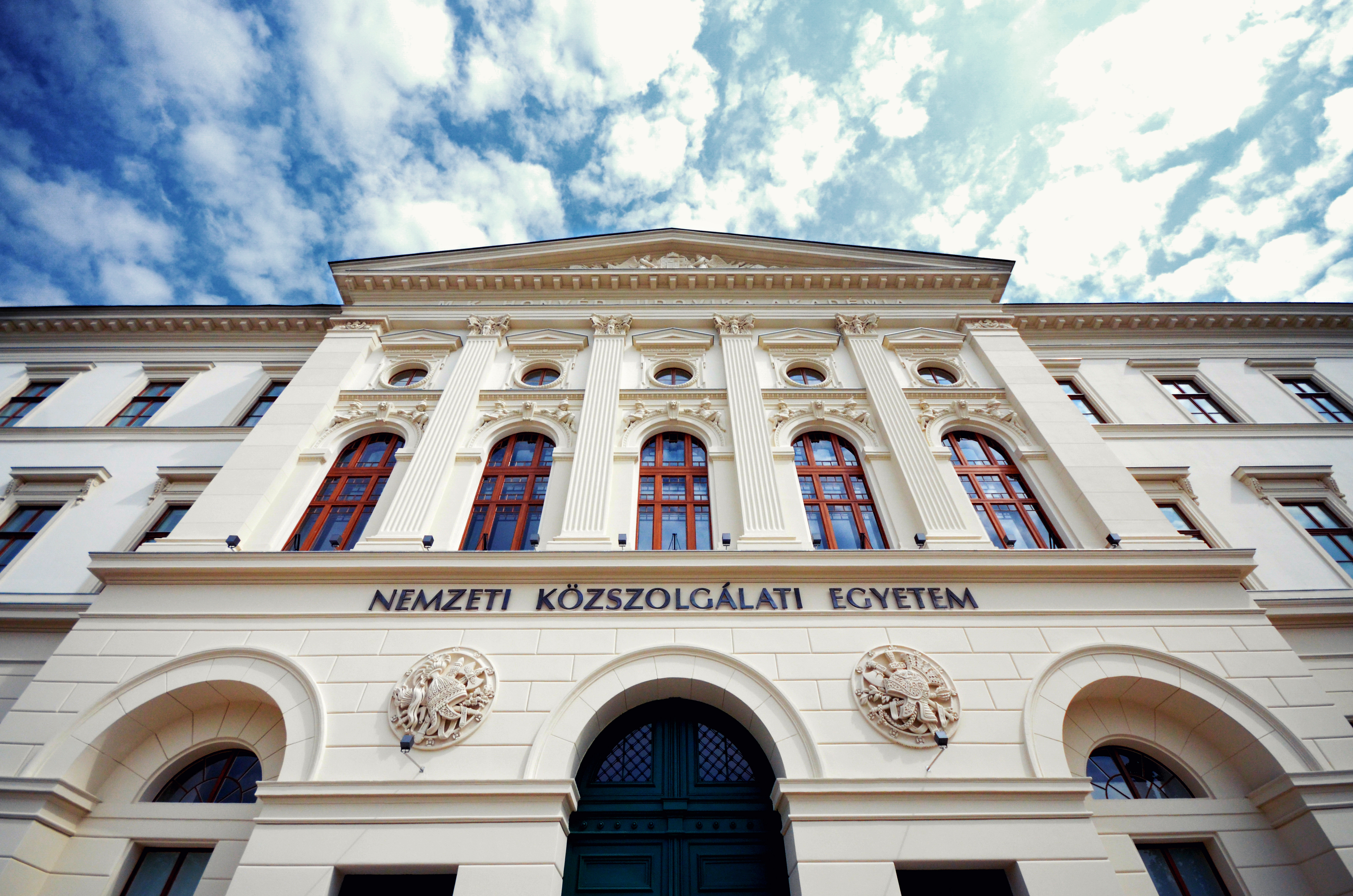
Facade of the main building at the Ludovika Campus

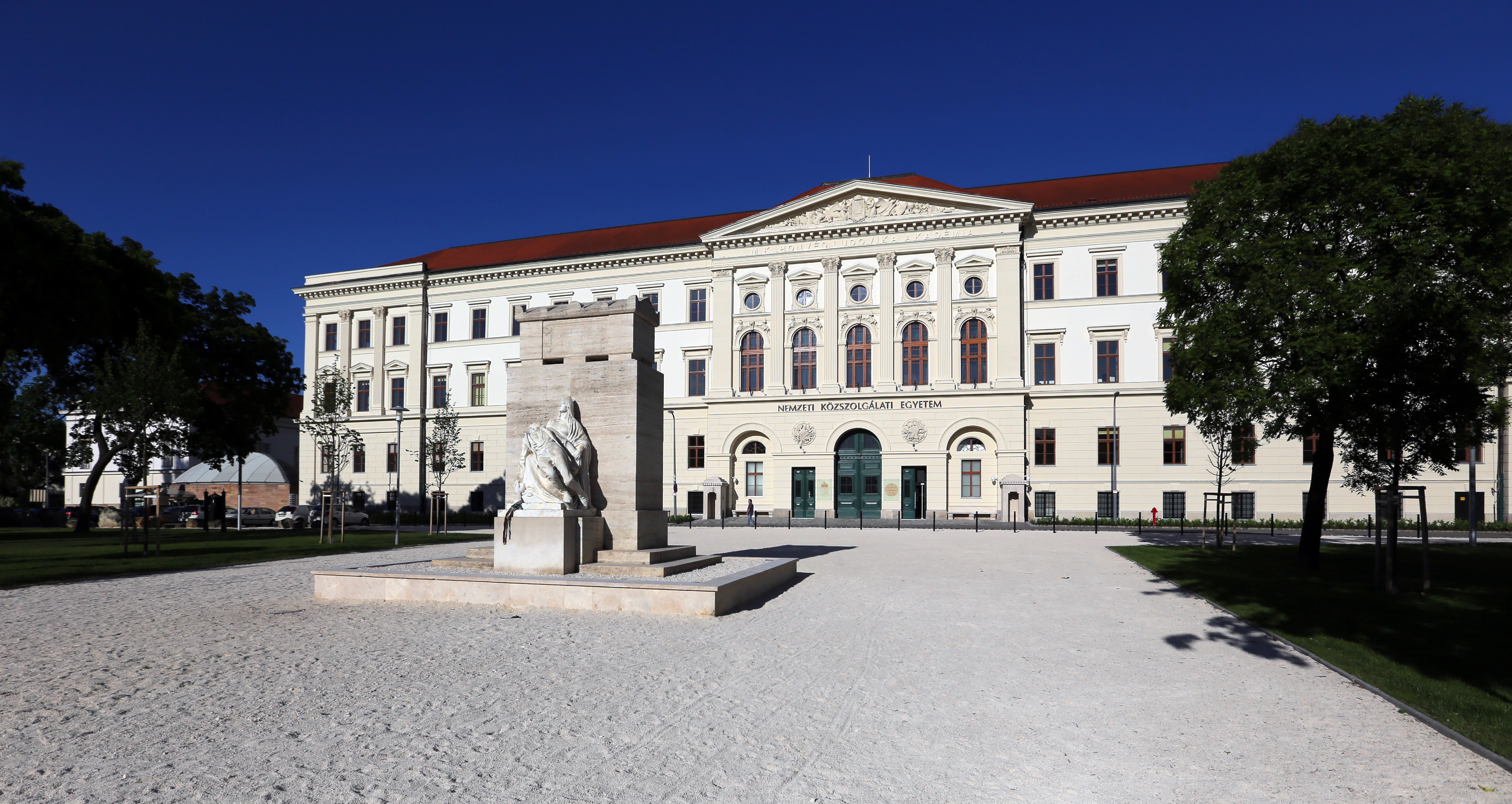
Ludovika Campus (2014)

== Notable graduates ==
- Kamill Aggházy (1882–1954) military officer, military historian.
- Pál Almásy (1818–1882) military officer, military engineer.
- Tibor Berczelly (1912–1990) fencer, sport target shooter.
- Béla H. Bánáthy, (1919–2003) military officer, educator, and systems scientist
- Lajos Bánfalvy (1906-1944) military officer, military intelligent.
- István Berkó (1880–1958) military officer, military historian.
- Miklós Bonczos (1897–1971) politician, Minister of the Interior (1944).
- Károly Csáky (1873–1945) military officer, Minister of Defense (1923–1929).
- Béla Dálnoki Miklós (1890–1948) military officer, politician, Prime Minister of the temporary government (1944–1945).
- Gyula Erdélyi (1892–1949) military officer, military historian.
- Kamill Erdoss (1924–1962) folklorist, linguist.
- Gábor Faragho (1890–1953) military officer, politician, Minister of Public Welfare (1944–1945).
- Ferenc Fáy (1921–1981) poet.
- Zoltán Franyó (1887–1978) writer, screenwriter, editor.
- Loránd Fráter (1872–1930) lyricist.
- Sándor Győrffy-Bengyel (1886–1942) military officer, politician, Minister of Public Welfare (1941–1942).
- Samu Hazai (1851–1942) military officer, Minister of Defence (1910–1917).
- Vilmos Hellebronth (1895–1971) military officer, politician.
- Jenő Horváth (1852–1915) military officer, military historian, member of Hungarian Academy of Sciences.
- Gyula Kádár (1898–1982) military officer.
- Géza Káplány (1880–1952) librarian.
- Béla Király (1912-2009) officer, historian, politician.
- Lajos Kiss (1922–2003) linguist, Slav specialist, member of Hungarian Academy of Sciences.
- Antal Kunder (1900–1968) military engineer, politician, Minister of Industry, Trade and Commerce (1938–1939, 1944).
- István Lágyi (1901–1978) cartographer.
- Árpád Lajtos (1910–1986) military officer.
- Géza Lakatos (1890–1967) military officer, politician, Prime Minister (1944).
- Pál Maléter (1917–1958) military officer, politician, Minister of Defense (1956).
- Antal Pálinkás-Pallavicini (1922–1957) military officer.
- Denes Pataky (1916-1987) military officer, Five time Hungarian Figure Skating Champion.
- Jeno Pilch (1872–1937) military historian, member of Hungarian Academy of Sciences.
- Pál Prónay (1874–1946?) military officer, leader of the Prónay detachment.
- Imre Radványi (1909–1984) military engineer.
- Liviu Rebreanu (1885–1944), writer, Director of the National Theatre Bucharest (1928–1930 and 1940–1944).
- Endre Rodriguez (1899–1975) film director.
- Vilmos Rőder (1881–1969) military officer, Minister of Defense (1936–1938).
- György Saly (1915–2003) military officer, historian
- Sándor Szurmay (1860–1945) military officer, Minister of Defense (1917–1918).
- Jenő Tombor (1880–1946) military officer, Minister of Defense (1945–1946).
- Zoltán Tóth (1888–1958) historian, member of Hungarian Academy of Sciences.

== See also ==
- Royal Hungarian Honvéd
- Royal Hungarian Army
- Ludovika University of Public Service

== Literature ==
Rada Tibor: The combined Histories of the Royal Hungarian Ludovica Military Academy and Her Sister Institutes (1830–1945), Gálos-Nyomdász Kft., Budapest, 1998. (Hungarian: A Magyar Királyi Honvéd Ludovika Akadémia. és a Testvérintézetek Összefoglalt Története (1830-1945), Gálos-Nyomdász Kft., Budapest, 1998.) (Magyarul) Saly, György. Visszaemlékezések a magyar királyi honvédség nehéztüzérségére, Saly György. Montréal, Canada : 1995. (https://catalog.loc.gov/vwebv/citeRecord?searchId=100&recPointer=0&recCount=25&searchType=1&bibId=1190253)

== External sources ==
- The resulting Act II of 1812, based on recommendations to establish the Ludovica Academy. (Hungarian: 1812. évi II. törvénycikk a katonai Ludovika-akadémia részére folytatólag tett ajánlatokról), (in Hungarian)
- Returning to Orczy Park (Hungarian: Vissza az Orczy-kertbe!) (in Hungarian)
- 100 more days in the world, then... (Hungarian: Még 100 nap a világ, aztán…) (in Hungarian)
