= András Perczel =

Perczel András
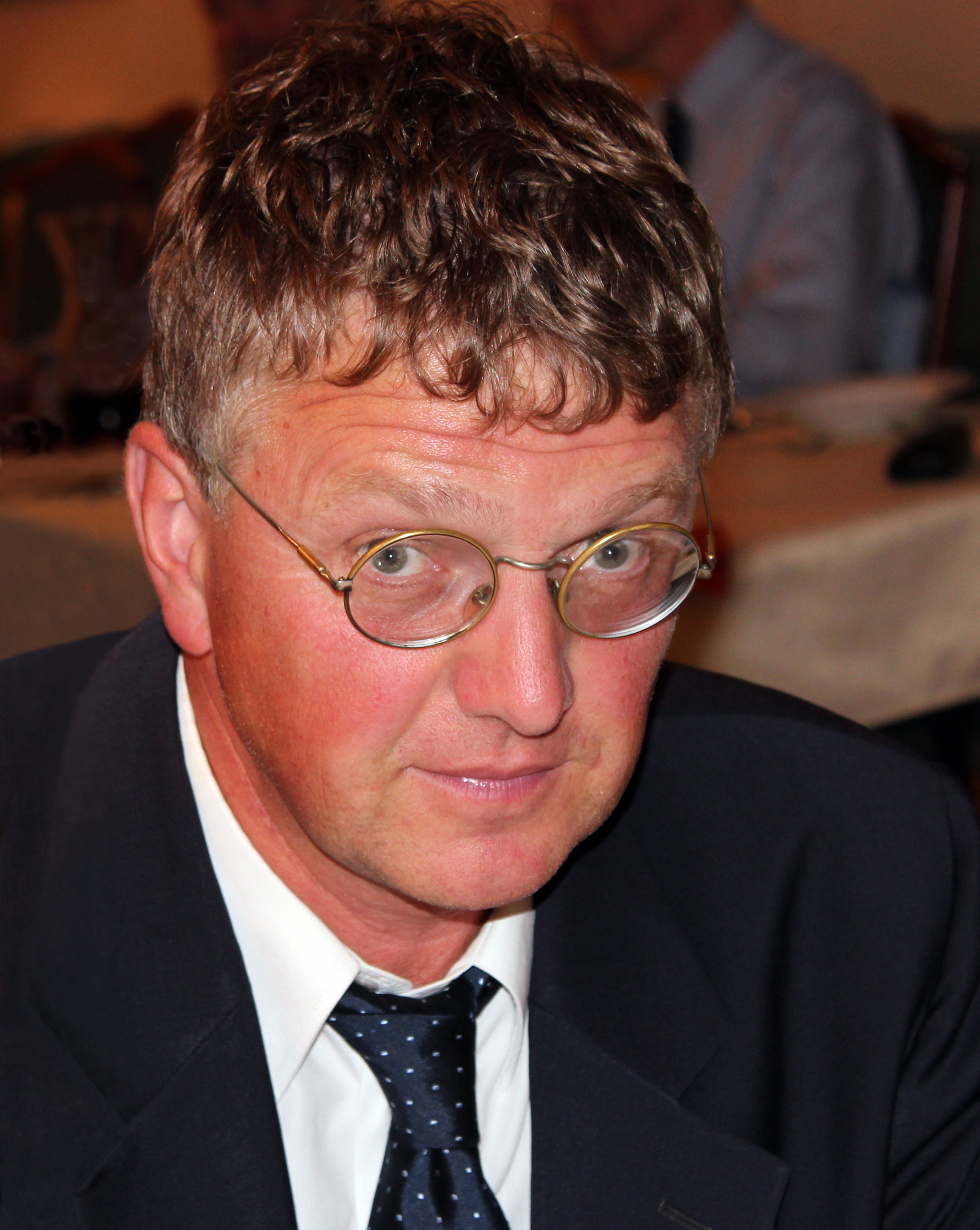
- Born: 10 May 1959 (age 67); Budapest, Hungary
- Education: Eötvös Loránd Tudományegyetem
- Known for: NMR spectroscopy of biomolecules
- Awards: Bolyai prize (2011)
- Scientific career
- Fields: biochemistry, NMR-spectroscopy
- Workplaces: Eötvös Loránd Tudományegyetem,

András Perczel (born 10 May 1959) is a Hungarian chemist, biochemist, university professor, an elected member of the Hungarian Academy of Sciences. His major field of research is structural chemistry and biology including synthesis of biomolecules and NMR spectroscopy of peptides and proteins. He was awarded the Bolyai prize (in Hungarian Bolyai János Alkotói díj) in 2011.

== Life ==
Graduating from Piarista Gimnázium, Budapest, he studied chemistry from 1980 at Eötvös Loránd University (ELTE), where he graduated as chemist in 1985. As a PhD student, besides his research he held practical classes in organic chemistry at the teachers’ training college of ELTE. While carrying on the practical classes, in 1987 Perczel became a scientific member of the Faculty of Organic Chemistry at ELTE. After habilitation in 1999 he was nominated as a full professor in 2001. In 2007 became the head of the Department of Organic Chemistry. In addition his university work he is the head of the joint Protein Modelling Group of the Hungarian Academy of Sciences and ELTE. He has performed his research work between 1998 and 2001 as a Széchenyi Professor, and participating the Fulbright program (2006).

He received his PhD in 1992, and his academic doctorate (D.Sc) in 1998. In 2010 he was elected a “corresponding” member of the Hungarian Academy of Sciences, Member of The Academy of Europe. In addition to his academic title, he is the founding president of the Biomolecular Chemistry Group of the Hungarian Chemical Society, member of the Hungarian Biochemical Society, and curator oft several foundations (Márton Kajtár Foundation, Foundation for the Hungarian Peptide and protein research, Lajos Kisfaludy Foundation, The Rosztoczy Foundation). He is a member of the European Peptide Symposium (EPS) and member of the editorial board of Journal of Molecular Structure.

== Work ==
András Perczel's main field of research is organic and bioorganic chemistry, structure elucidation of biomolecules, peptides and proteinsby CD-, NMR spectroscopy and molecular modelling.

His major researches include synthesis of peptides, foldamers and proteins by solid state synthesis and biotechnological methods. He has achieved his most important results by use of spectroscopy: he has studied bioactive peptides with CD, NMR spectroscopy and molecular modelling.

He is the author or co-author of about 200 scientific publications with more than 3000 independent references. He is the author of a book (in Hungarian) and several course book chapters.

== Prizes ==
- Pro Scientia (1993, 1995)
- Zemplén Géza prize (1996)
- Prize of ELTE, Faculty Scientifices (1997)
- Scientist of the year in Hungary 2004, Sanofi-Synthelabo
- Bolyai prize (2011)

== Publications ==
- Phosphorylation loops in synthetic peptides of the human neurofilament protein middle-sized subunit (co-author, 1988)
- Convex constraint analysis - A natural deconvolution of circular-dichroism curves of proteins (1991)
- Analysis of the circular-dichroism spectrum of proteins using the convex constraint algorithm - A practical guide (1992)
- Peptidek térszerkezet-vizsgálata (co-author, 1994)
- NMR studies of a viral protein that mimics the regulators of complement activation (co-author, 1997)
- Membrane translocation of penetratin and its derivatives in different cell lines (co-author, 2003)
- Theoretical study on tertiary structural elements of β-peptides: Nanotubes formed from parallel-sheet-derived assemblies of β-peptides (co-author, 2006)
- Determining the molecular basis for the pH-dependent interaction between the Link module of human TSG-6 and hyaluronan (co-author, 2007)
- ”Dead-end street of protein folding: Thermodynamic rationale of amyloid fibril formation” (co-author, 2007)
- Cooperation between a salt bridge and the hydrophobic core triggers fold stabilization in a Trp-cage miniprotein (co-author, 2008)
- “Local structural preferences of calpastatin, the intrinsically unstructured protein inhibitor of calpain” (co-author, 2008)
- ”Hyperfine-Shifted (13)C Resonance Assignments in an Iron-Sulfur Protein with Quantum Chemical Verification: Aliphatic C-H center dot center dot center dot S 3-Center-4-Electron Interactions” (co-author, 2011)

== Sources ==
- Perczel András. In MTI Ki kicsoda (Who is Who?) 2009. Editor: Hermann Péter. Budapest: Magyar Távirati Iroda Zrt.. 2008. p. 866
