= János Besenyő =

Hungarian military historian and researcher

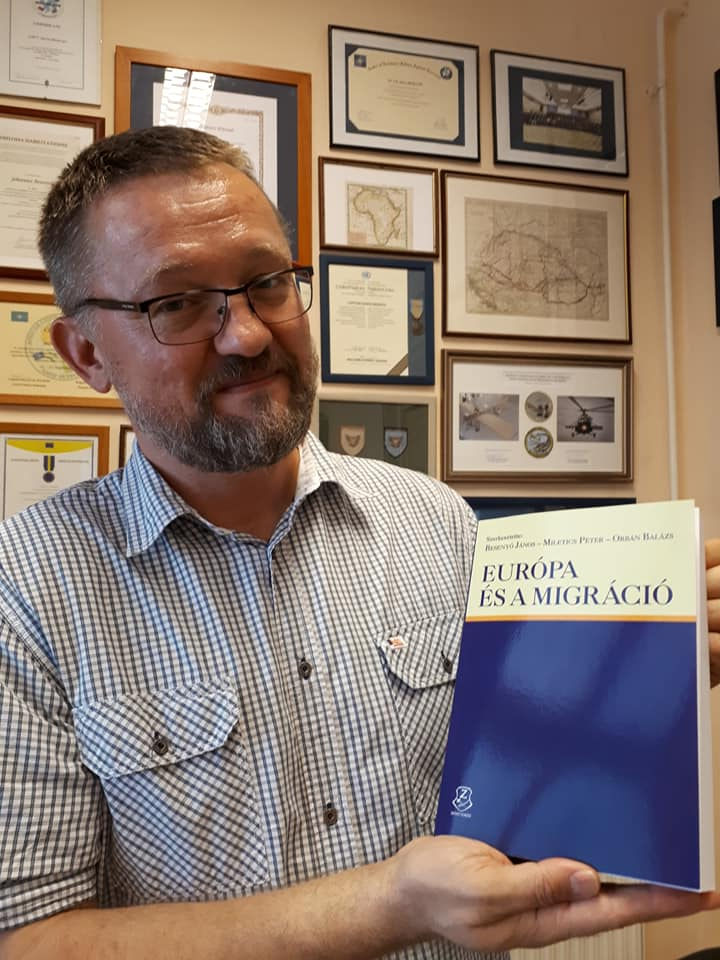
Besenyő in 2020

János Besenyő is a Hungarian military historian and researcher on African security. He is a professor at Óbuda University and heads its Africa Research Institute. He also serves as a visiting professor at Stellenbosch University's Centre for Military Studies in South Africa.

Born in 1972, Besenyő served as an officer in the Hungarian Defence Forces between 1987 and 2018, rising from non-commissioned officer to colonel. He participated in peacekeeping deployments in Western Sahara, Darfur, and Afghanistan. Between 2014 and 2018 he established and led the Scientific Research Centre of the Hungarian Defence Forces General Staff.

== Work on Western Sahara ==
Besenyő's research on the Western Sahara conflict is his most widely reviewed output. The 2023 edited volume Conflict and Peace in Western Sahara: The Role of the UN's Peacekeeping Mission (MINURSO) (Routledge), co-edited with R. Joseph Huddleston and Yahia H. Zoubir, received reviews in International Peacekeeping, E-International Relations, Contemporary Military Challenges, Magyar Tudomány, and the Journal of Security and Sustainability Issues, among others. His earlier Hungarian-language monograph on the same conflict, A nyugat-szaharai válság: Egy magyar békefenntartó szemével, has been cited in subsequent Western Sahara scholarship.

== Other research ==
His other work covers African conflicts more broadly, migration policy, terrorism, and peacekeeping operations. The 2019 volume Európa és a migráció, co-authored with Péter Miletics and Balázs Orbán, was reviewed in Belügyi Szemle. The 2024 volume Terrorism and Counter-Terrorism in Modern Sub-Saharan Africa (Springer) has been cited in subsequent work on regional terrorism and state fragility.

Besenyő's work is cited in international scholarship on Western Sahara and African security, including articles in Review of African Political Economy, Modern Law Review, and American Ethnologist.

== Academic positions ==
Besenyő has been a professor at Óbuda University since 2018 and is a voting internal member of the council of its Doctoral School of Safety and Security Sciences. He earned his PhD in military sciences from Zrínyi Miklós National Defence University in 2010 and completed his habilitation in history at Eötvös Loránd University in 2017. He is also a lecturer at the National University of Public Service, Eötvös Loránd University, and Eszterházy Károly Catholic University.

He serves on the editorial boards of several journals, including Terrorism and Political Violence, the Journal of Human Trafficking, and the Journal of Central and Eastern European African Studies.
