= András Kovács =

András Kovács may refer to:

- András Kovács (film director) (1925–2017), Hungarian film director and screenwriter
- András Kovács (sociologist) (1947), Hungarian sociologist
