= Gergely András Molnár =

Hungarian centenarian (1897–2006)

Gergely András Molnár (16 November 1897 – 22 March 2006) was, at age 108, one of the last Hungarian World War I veterans. There, he served on the Russian front in the Annex II. He later served for six years in World War II. Molnár received the highest honors for his country and was awarded the First degree in National Defence. He was born in Kiskundorozsma.

At the time of his death he was the oldest living person in Hungary. He was the verified longest living Hungarian man ever until 2012 when Rezső Gallai surpassed his record (Gallai went on to become the oldest man in Europe and lived until 110 years of age).
