= András Lelkes =

Hungarian gymnast

- Born: 22 December 1935 (age 90) Kalocsa, Kingdom of Hungary
- Height: 1.72 m (5 ft 8 in)
- Spouse: Mária Bencsik

Gymnastics career
- Discipline: Men's artistic gymnastics
- Country represented: Hungary
- Club: Budapesti Honvéd Sportegyesület

András Lelkes (born 22 December 1935) is a Hungarian gymnast. He competed in eight events at the 1964 Summer Olympics.
