= Hungarian Chemical Society =

Academic society

- Magyar Kémikusok Egyesülete
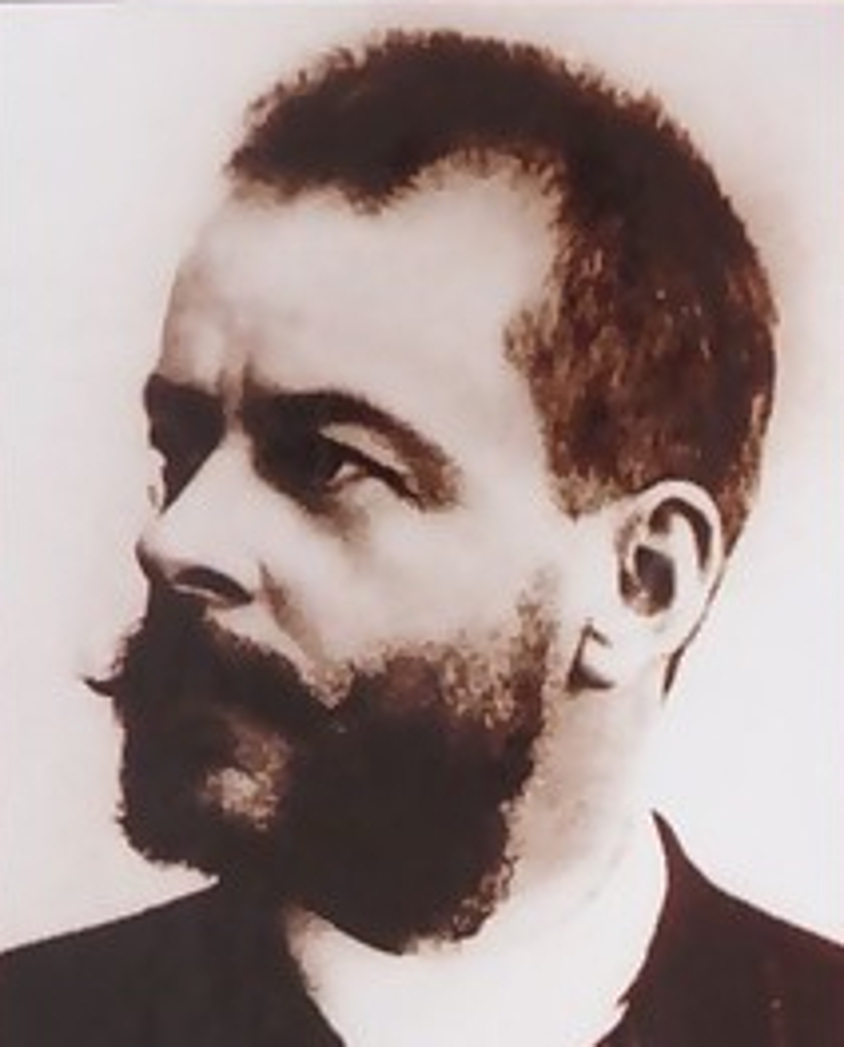
- Rudolf Fabinyi, the first president of the society
- Formation: 1907; 119 years ago
- Purpose: Education, science
- Location: Hungary
- Fields: Chemistry
- Members: 2,000 (2015)
- Website: Official website

The Hungarian Chemical Society (Hungarian: Magyar Kémikusok Egyesülete, pronounced [ˈmɒɟɒr ˈkeːmikuʃok ˈɛɟːɛʃylɛtɛ]) was founded in 1907. It is a voluntary society of more than 2,000 members which aims to provide a forum for those interested in chemistry and promote chemistry in Hungary.

The Hungarian Chemical Journal (Hungarian: Magyar Kémikusok Lapja) is the official journal of the society and is released monthly.
