= András Serfőző =

Hungarian politician (1950–2021)

Member of the Hungarian National Assembly
- In office 1994–2006
- Constituency: Individual Constituency Nógrád County No. 3

Personal details
- Born: 5 May 1950 Endrefalva, Hungary
- Died: 12 April 2021 (aged 70) Hungary
- Party: MSZP

András Serfőző (5 May 1950 – 12 April 2021) was a Hungarian politician.

== Biography ==
Born in Endrefalva, Serfőző graduated from the Faculty of Law at Eötvös Loránd University in 1974. He then worked as a legal advisor at the Agricultural Producers' Cooperative. In 1981, he passed the bar and became a judge for the Nógrád County Registry Court in 1989.

In 1994, Serfőző was elected to serve in the National Assembly as a member of the Hungarian Socialist Party, representing the Individual Constituency Nógrád County No. 3. He served on the Committee on Constitutional Affairs and the Committee on Agriculture while on the National Assembly, where he served until 2006. From 2006 to 2011, he was then a county councilor.

András Serfőző died on 12 April 2021 at the age of 70.
