= András Kertész =

Hungarian linguist

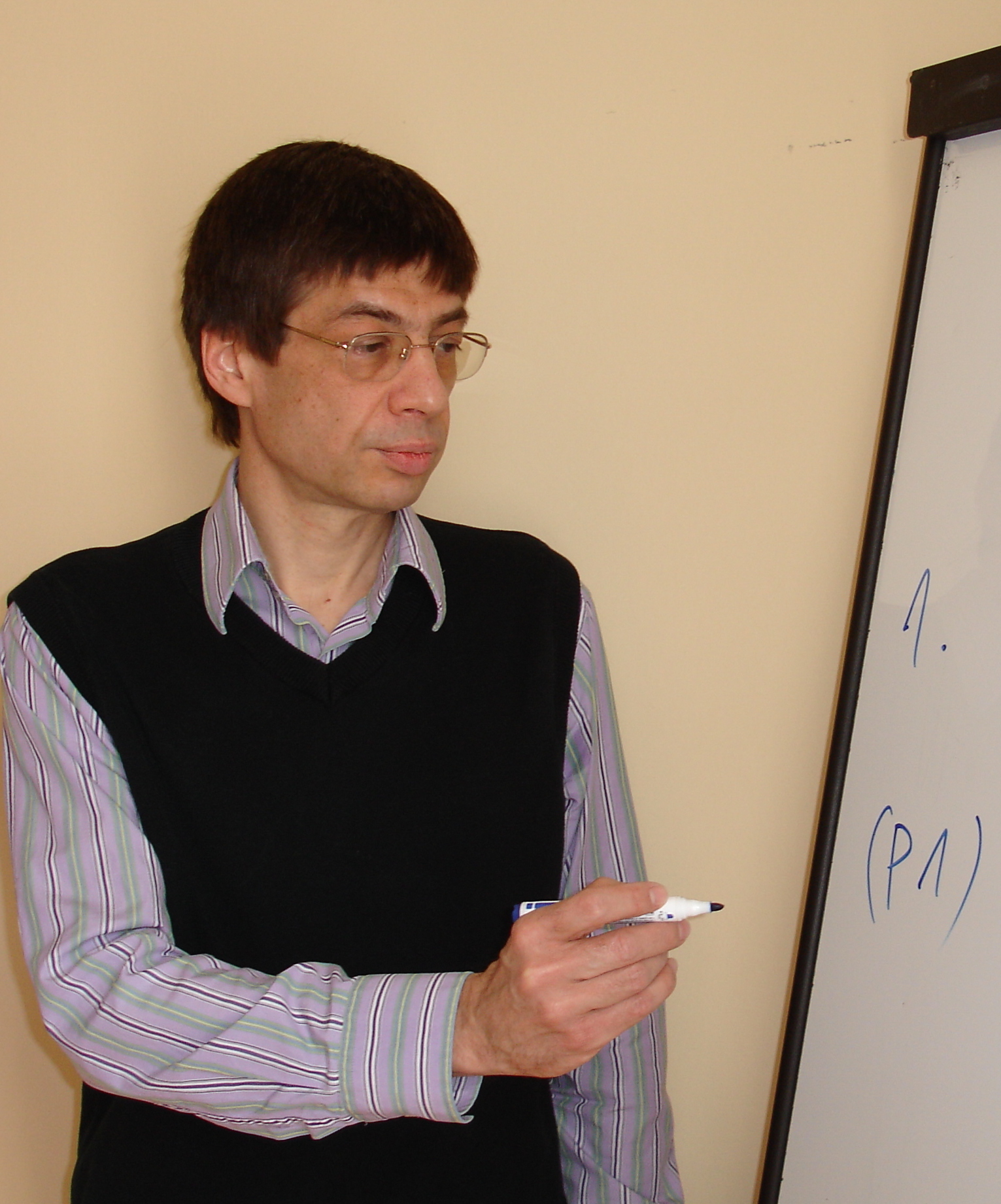
- Portrait of András Kertész at his lecture
- Born: March 8, 1956 (age 70); Debrecen, Hungary
- Education: University of Debrecen
- Known for: Philosophy of linguistics
- Spouse: Ildikó Tóth
- Awards: Széchenyi Prize, 2017
- Scientific career
- Fields: the philosophy of linguistics; Theoretical linguistics; German linguistics
- Workplaces: Hungarian Academy of Sciences
- Website: official website in English

András Kertész (Hungarian: [ˈɒndraːʃ ˈkɛrteːs]; born 8 March 1956) is a Hungarian linguist, professor, full member of the Hungarian Academy of Sciences. His research focuses on the philosophy of linguistics, theoretical linguistics and foundational problems of syntax, semantics and pragmatics. He works both in Hungary and around the world, and has published in English, German and Hungarian.

== Biography and career ==
He was born on 8 March 1956 in Debrecen, Hungary. He took M.A. degrees at the Lajos Kossuth University, Faculty of Arts in English and German studies in Debrecen in 1981.

He started his academic career at the Department of German Studies at the Kossuth University. In 1987 he became an assistant professor and was appointed to an associate professor (docent, reader) in 1991. He acted as a head of department from 1994 until 2001. In 2000 the three universities in Debrecen were integrated into the University of Debrecen. In 1996 he received the title of university (full) professor and in the same year he was appointed to the Head of the Institute of German Studies and managed it until 1999. From 2001 until 2017 he acted as a head of the Graduate School of Linguistics at the Faculty of Arts at the University of Debrecen. He acted as the head of the Department of Theoretical Linguistics from 2005 until 2007 and then he managed the Department of German Linguistics.

András Kertész received his dr. univ. (doctor universitatis) degree in 1983. He took the candidate (C.Sc.) of Linguistics degree in 1981 and was awarded Doctor of Science (D.Sc.) degree in Linguistics in 1996. He was elected to corresponding membership of the Hungarian Academy of Sciences in 2001 and to full membership in 2010. From 2014 until 2020 he was the chairman of the Section of Linguistics and Literary Scholarship of the Hungarian Academy of Sciences and member of the Academy's board. In 2014 he was elected as a member of the Academy of Europe (Academia Europaea, London).

András Kertész lectured as a visiting professor in Germany: the University of Tübingen, the University of Greifswald, the University of Jena, Bielefeld University, Technische Universität Berlin and the IDS – Institute of German Language (Institut für Deutsche Sprache), Mannheim.

Since 1992 he was the principal investigator of 18 research projects.

== Family ==
His father, Andor Kertész (1929−1974) was a Hungarian mathematician, full member of the Academy of Sciences Leopoldina, (East) Germany. His mother, Ilona Tóth was a teacher of history and geography. He has a sibling. His younger sister, Gabriella Kertész (born 1959) is a physician. András Kertész's wife is Ildikó Tóth. They have two children, a daughter and a son.

== Committee memberships ==
=== Editorial board memberships ===
- Editor-in-chief of the refereed international series MetaLinguistica (Frankfurt & Bern & Brussels & New York & Oxford & Vienna: Lang) since 1995.
- Editor-in-chief of the refereed international journal Sprachtheorie und germanistische Linguistik (Münster: Nodus) since 1995.
- Member of the Editorial Board of the refereed series Officina Textologica (Debrecen: Debrecen University Press) since 1997.
- Member of the Editorial Board of the refereed international journal Acta Linguistica Academica (Budapest: Akadémiai Kiadó) since 1998.
- Member of the Editorial Board of the refereed international journal Logos and Language. Journal for General Linguistics and Language Theory (Tübingen: Narr), 2000-2008.
- Editor-in-chief of the refereed open access journal Argumentum (Debrecen: Debrecen University Press) since 2005.
- Co-editor of the refereed series Theoretical and Experimental Linguistics (Debrecen: Debrecen University Press), 2005-2015.

=== Carrier-related public activities ===
- 2014 – Chairman, Section of Linguistics and Literary Scholarship, Hungarian Academy of Sciences
- 2013 – 2017 Co-chairman of the Scientific Council of the University of Debrecen
- 2010 – Head of the Distinguished Research Field ‘Human Sciences’ of the University of Debrecen
- 2008 – 2014 Chairman of the Linguistics Board of the Hungarian Academy of Sciences
- 2006 – Director of the Research Centre for Linguistics and Philosophy of the University of Debrecen
- 2004 – 2007 Chairman of the Linguistics and Philosophy Board of the Hungarian Accreditation Committee
- 2003 – 2006 President of the Hungarian Association for German Studies (Gesellschaft Ungarischer Germanisten]
- 2003 – Head of the Research Group for Theoretical Linguistics of the Hungarian Academy of Sciences
- 2001–2008 Member of the Doctoral Council of the Hungarian Academy of Sciences

== Achievements ==
His main fields of interest are in the philosophy of linguistics and theoretical linguistics with special respect to the foundational problems of syntax, semantics and pragmatics. Within the framework of his modular philosophy of linguistics he revealed the relationship between the cognitive and the social factors of linguistic theorizing. He extended the methods of both modular and holistic cognitive linguistics to the analysis of scientific concept formation. He developed the heuristics of the segmental phonology of German. Together with Csilla Rákosi he put forward the so-called ’p-model’ of plausible argumentation which, besides capturing the structure of linguistic theories, can also be applied to the solution of problems in the general philosophy of science and argumentation theory.

== Awards and honors ==
- 2017 Széchenyi Prize (highest scientific award in Hungary)
- 2014 Member of Academy of Europe (Academia Europaea), London
- 2013 Pro Germanistica Hungarica Medal
- 2010 Full Member (F. M.) of the Hungarian Academy of Sciences
- 2009 Scientific Publication of the Year Gold Medal
- 2008 Dr. honoris causa (University of Pannonia, Veszprém, Hungary)
- 2008 Honorary Medal of the Faculty of Arts of the University of Debrecen
- 2003 Pro Scientia Medal (Regional Committee of the Hungarian Academy of Sciences)
- 2001 Corresponding Member of the Hungarian Academy of Sciences
- 1999–2001 Advisory Member of the Hungarian Academy of Sciences
- 1998–2002 Széchenyi Professorship
- 1995 Telegdi Scholarship (Center for Advanced Study in the Behavioral Sciences at Stanford University)
- 1992 Alexander von Humboldt Fellowship
- 1988 Kanyó Zoltán Award
- 1987–1988 DAAD (German Academic Exchange Service)-Fellowship

== Works ==
=== Books ===
- Kertész, András: Heuristik der deutschen Phonologie. Eine elementare Einführung in Strategien der Problemlösung. Budapest: Akadémiai Kiadó, 1993.
- Kertész, András: Artificial Intelligence and the Sociology of Knowledge: Prolegomena to an Integrated Philosophy of Science. Frankfurt am Main: Lang, 1993.
- Kertész, András: Die Ferse und der Schild. Über Möglichkeiten und Grenzen kognitionswissenschaftlicher Theorien der Erkenntnis. Frankfurt am Main: Lang, 1995.
- Kertész, András: Metalinguistik. Grundlagen und Fallstudien. Debrecen: Latin Betűk, 1999.
- Kertész András: Nyelvészet és tudományelmélet. Budapest: Akadémiai Kiadó, 2001.
- Kertész, András: Cognitive Semantics and Scientific Knowledge: Case Studies in the Cognitive Science of Science. Amsterdam & Philadelphia: Benjamins, 2004.
- Kertész, András: Philosophie der Linguistik. Studien zur naturalisierten Wissenschaftstheorie. Tübingen: Narr, 2004.
- Kertész, András: Die Modularität der Wissenschaft. Konzeptuelle und soziale Prinzipien linguistischer Erkenntnis. Wiederveröffentlichung. Berlin: Springer, 2013 (1. Auflage: 1991)
- Kertész, András & Rákosi, Csilla (eds.): The Evidential Basis of Linguistic Argumentation. Amsterdam & Philadelphia: Benjamins, 2014.
- Kertész, András: The Historiography of Generative Linguistics. Tübingen: Narr Francke Attempto, 2017.
- Kertész, András & Rákosi, Csilla: Data and Evidence in Linguistics: A Plausible Argumentation Model. Paperback edition. Cambridge: Cambridge University Press, 2019. (First edition: 2012)
- Kertész, András & Moravcsik, Edith & Rákosi, Csilla (eds.): Current Approaches to Syntax: A Comparative Handbook. Berlin & Boston: de Gruyter Mouton, 2019.
- Kertész, András: Plauzibilis érvelés a generatív nyelvészet történetében. Második, javított kiadás. Budapest: Akadémiai Kiadó, 2020. (Első kiadás: 2015)
- Kertész András & Rákosi Csilla: Adatok és plauzibilis érvelés a nyelvészetben. Második, javított kiadás. Budapest: Akadémiai Kiadó, 2020. (Első kiadás: 2008)
