= András Mészáros =

András Mészáros may refer to:

- András Mészáros (cyclist) (born 1941), Hungarian cyclist
- András Mészáros (footballer) (born 1996), Hungarian footballer
