= András László =

András László may refer to:

- András László (footballer) (born 1976), Hungarian footballer
- András László (politician) (born 1984), Hungarian politician
- Andrew Laszlo (András László, 1926–2011), Hungarian-American cinematographer
