= Katpol =

Hungarian government agency

Military Political Department of the Ministry of Defence
- Honvédelmi Minisztérium Katonapolitikai Osztály

Agency overview
- Formed: February 1945; 81 years ago
- Preceding agency: Second Department of the General Staff (Vezérkari Főnökség Második Osztálya, VKF-2.)
- Dissolved: 1 February 1950
- Superseding agency: State Protection Authority
- Headquarters: Hadik Barracks, 38 Bartók Béla street, XI. district, Budapest
- Agency executive: Lt. Gen. György Pálffy (1945–1949)

The Katpol, an abbreviation for Katonapolitikai Osztály (Military Political Department in Hungarian), and it was the main security agency of the Ministry of Defence in Hungary from January 1945 until its break-up in 1950.

== Creation ==
In the first months of 1945, the Interim Government of Hungary, that time based in Debrecen, started to reorganize the Ministry of Interior, the police and the state security agencies, as part of the democratization of Hungary.

The 40th Department of the Ministry of Defence was formed at the end of February 1945, as a military security agency. Its mission was to search and arrest those who committed military or war crimes, to screen and verify the officers of the former Royal Hungarian Army, to assess the remained military industrial capability of the country, to search the lost military equipments taken by the Germans or the Szálasi Government and to provide a close protection for the Defence Minister.

General János Vörös, Defence Minister of Hungary wrote to Kliment Voroshilov, the chairman of the Allied Control Commission on 12 March 1945: "I ask for your kind permission to organize the Military Offensive and Defensive Political Department inside the Ministry of Defence. (...) Its goal would be the fight against the fascist and reactionist activity inside the army, to hinder the enemy's intelligence activities, and to gather information from the occupied territories."

After the Allied Commission approved the plan, the Military Political Department established its central office with a counterintelligence unit, an intelligence unit, verifying unit (to screening and verifying the returning officers), guard unit, logistical unit and a personnel affairs unit. The department also had offices in every division, military district, at the border checkpoints and in the internment camps for the returning soldiers.

Before the Paris Peace Treaty, under the circumstances of the era, when the Hungarian Army was not allowed to plan or act independently, the counterintelligence activities became the most important part of the military, as they meant an easy way to influence the composition of the future officer corps.

György Pálffy was appointed as the leader of the newly established agency and with this decision the new agency came under the control of the Hungarian Communist Party. Pálffy was a former military officer, who resigned his commission in 1939, partly because of his anti-Nazi sentiments, but also because of her wife was from a Jewish family. Károly Beregfy, the later pro-Nazi Defence Minister, who was Pálffy's commander told him, that Pálffy would have a splendid career, if he would divorce "that Jewish whore". After a brief confrontation Pálffy left the army, and started to work in a factory, where he became a member of the illegal Communist Party. In 1944 he became the chairman of the Military Committee of the Communist Party and took part in the resistance movement in Budapest.

== Role in the Communist takeover of Hungary ==
The Military Political Department used illegal practices in its work from the beginnings. For example they undertook an unlawful surveillance of Béla Zsedényi, the Speaker of the Interim National Assembly without a warrant and they also collected data about János Vörös, the Defence Minister.

At the end of, and for a few years after the war, they were more professional than the Political Security Department of the Police, the later State Protection Authority and therefore they were the main security force behind the Communist takeover of Hungary. Their cruel and inhuman handle of their prisoners and the use of torture in investigation showed an example for the secret police.

The Katpol had a main role in the destruction of the FKGP, which party won a 59.9% majority on the elections of 1945. They forced the leaders and noted members of the party to emigrate. In August 1948, agents of the Katpol tried to assassinate the Defence Minister Péter Veres, who was the President of the Peasant Party and was one of the most popular politicians of the time in Hungary. After a second assassination attempt, Veres resigned his post with the support of his party.

== Reorganization ==
In January 1947 the department was reorganized into a separate military command, first with four, after March 1948 with seven (staff, counter-intelligence, military, wireless reconnaissance, intelligence, archives and personnel affairs) departments, with 609 personnel.

In 1948, with the reorganization of the secret police, most of the powers of the Katpol (like the border guards, the passport office, the supervisory authority of the foreign citizens) went to the newly founded State Protection Office of the Ministry of Interior.

On 1 February 1949, the Katpol was renamed to the Military Counterintelligence Command. In December 1949 after the communist takeover of the country was finished and all security agencies of Hungary were unified by the decision of the leadership of the Hungarian Working People's Party, the Katpol was incorporated into the State Protection Authority. For military intelligence, the task was delegated to MNVK-2.
