= András Tibor Horváth =

Hungarian politician

Member of the National Assembly
- In office 14 May 2010 – 5 May 2014

Personal details
- Born: 22 March 1964 (age 62) Budapest, Hungary
- Party: MSZP (since 1990)
- Profession: politician

András Tibor Horváth (born 22 March 1964) is a Hungarian politician, member of the National Assembly from the Hungarian Socialist Party's Fejér County Regional List from 2010 to 2014.

Horváth joined MSZP in 1990 and functioned as chairman of the party's Fejér County branch from 2001 to 2002 and since 2006. He served as Socialist group leader of the General Assembly of Fejér County between 2006 and 2010. Horváth was a member of the Parliamentary Committee on Agriculture between 14 May and 1 June 2010. He was appointed a member of the Committee on Sport and Tourism on 14 May 2010.
