= András Vikár =

Hungarian architect and educator

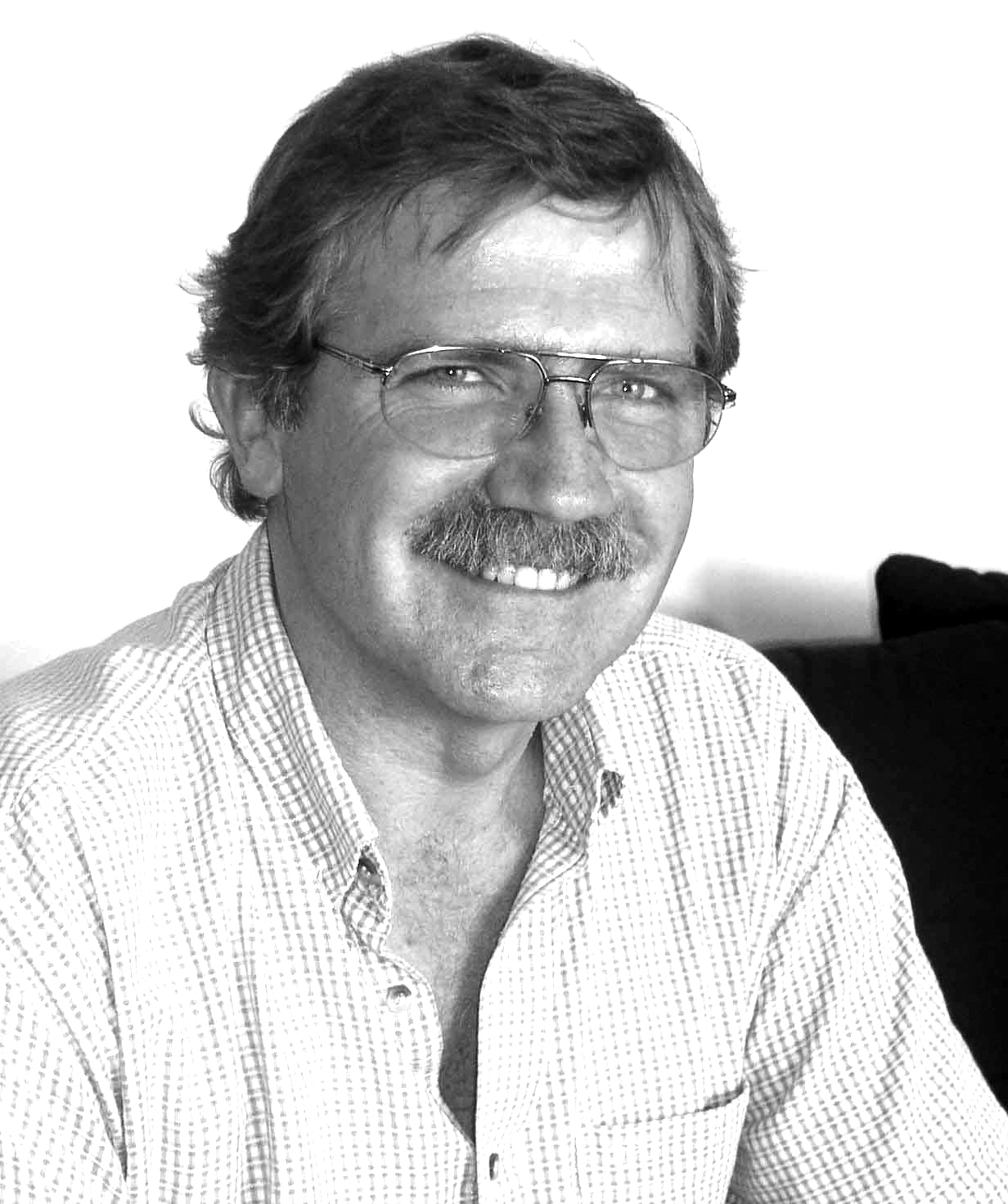
András Vikár

András Vikár, DLA (born 26 August 1953), is a Hungarian architect, educator, member of the Budapest Chamber of Architecture Planning committee. He was born in Budapest.
