= András Németh =

András Németh may refer to:

- András Németh (handball) (born 1953), Hungarian handball coach
- András Németh (footballer) (born 2002), South African-Hungarian football forward
