= András Csonka =

András Csonka may refer to:

- András Csonka (footballer) (born 2000), Hungarian footballer
- András Csonka (table tennis) (born 1988), Hungarian table tennis player
