= Endrefalva =

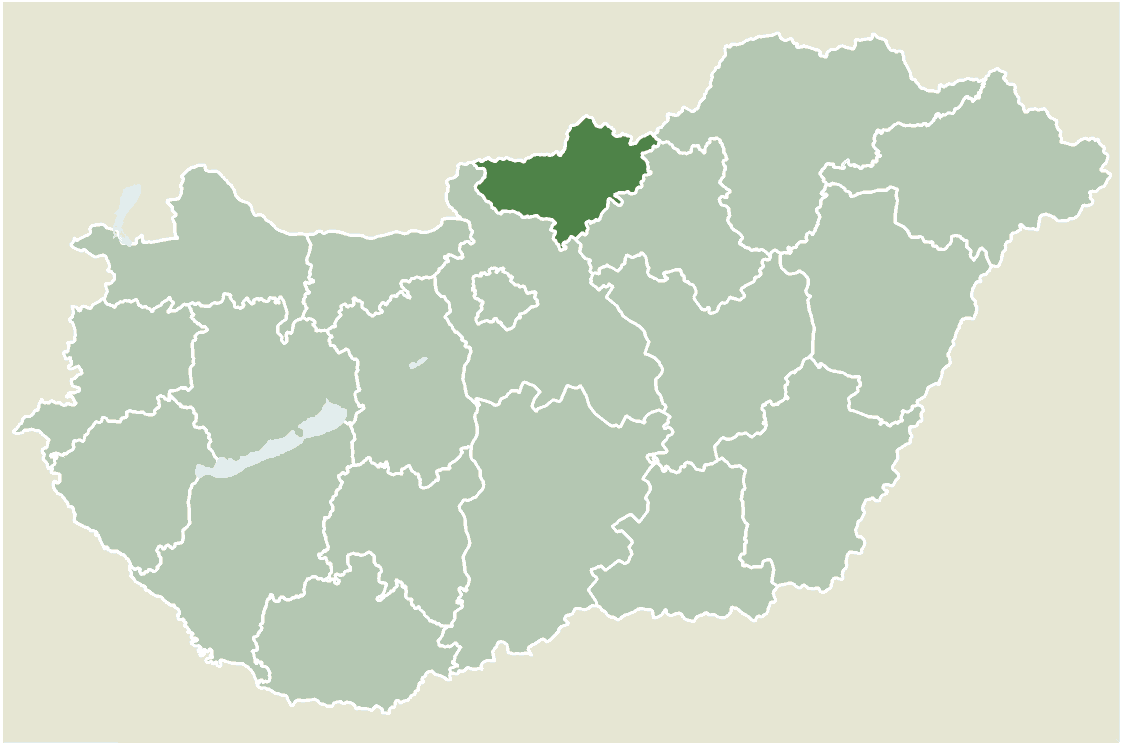
- Location of Nógrád county in Hungary

- Location of Endrefalva
- Coordinates: 48.12785°N 19.57325°E
- Country: Hungary
- County: Nógrád

Area
  - Total: 13.22 km^{2} (5.10 sq mi)

Population (2004)
  - Total: 1,273
  - Density: 96.29/km^{2} (249.4/sq mi)
- Time zone: UTC+1 (CET)
  - Summer (DST): UTC+2 (CEST)
- Postal code: 3165
- Area code: 32

Endrefalva is a village in Nógrád county, Hungary.

Population by year
Year	Population
1870	868
1880	832
1890	952
1900	1076
1910	1121
1920	1210
1930	1337
1941	1353
1949	1414
1960	1501
1970	1516
1980	1348
1990	1235
2001	1207
2011	1270
