= András Kovács (sociologist) =

Hungarian sociologist and historian

- Born: January 6, 1947 (age 79); Budapest, Hungary
- Education: Eötvös Loránd University
- Occupations: Sociologist, historian
- Employer: Central European University
- Known for: Jewish studies, antisemitism research, post-communist Hungary
- Awards: Széchenyi Prize (2013), Knight's Cross of the Order of Merit (2006)

András Kovács (born 6 January 1947, in Budapest, Hungary) is a Hungarian sociologist and historian. He is a professor at Central European University, Budapest, in the Nationalism Studies Program and Jewish Studies Program. Furthermore, Kovács is a Doctor of Sciences at the Hungarian Academy of Sciences.

== Biography ==
He graduated with a degree in philosophy and history in 1971 at the Eötvös Loránd University, Faculty of Philosophy, Budapest. From 1972 through 1978, he worked as an editor at a publishing house. In 1978 he was dismissed for political reasons and banned from professional activity in Hungary because of clandestine publication of the first samisdat volume in Hungary under the title "Marx in the Fourth Decade". Between 1978 and 1989 free-lance translator, and active member of the democratic opposition [hu] to the communist regime. Between 1980 and 1983 he was visiting professor/researcher at Paderborn University (FRG), École des Hautes Études en Sciences Sociales (Paris), New York University (New York City), TH Twente (the Netherlands). He initiated the first systematic research on post-Holocaust Hungarian Jewry, and published the first results in publications of the democratic opposition.

After the democratic transition, he taught as professor at the Eötvös Loránd University and served as senior research fellow at the Hungarian Academy of Sciences. Between 1989 and 1995 he was the head of the political advisory board of the Fidesz Party, and the personal advisor of the later prime minister, Viktor Orbán. In 1997, he became a professor at the Central European University, and in 2002 director of its Jewish Studies program. After 1988 he was guest lecturer/scholar at the Salomon Steinheim Institut für Deutsch-Jüdische Geschichte, Duisburg, Germany, the Institut für die Wissenschaften vom Menschen, Vienna, Austria, the Moses Mendelssohn Zentrum für Jüdische Studien, Potsdam, Germany, the Internationales Forschungszentrum Kulturwissenschaften, Vienna, Austria, the Institut für Soziologie, Universität Wien, as well as the Zentrum für Antisemitismusforschung, TU Berlin.

== Academic works ==
His main research subjects are contemporary antisemitism, Jews in post-war Hungary, Jewish policy of Communist parties; memory and identity; contemporary far right in Europe. Until 2020 he published more than 150 works in several languages. His most important publications in English:

- The Stranger at Hand. Antisemitic Prejudices in post-Communist Hungary. Brill, Leiden – Boston 2011.
- "Antisemitic Prejudice and Political Antisemitism in Present-Day Hungary". In: Journal for Study of Antisemitism, Volume 4, Issue #2, 2012,
- "Variations on a Theme: The Jewish 'Other' in Old and New Antisemitic Media Discourses in Hungary in the 1940s and in 2011" (with Anna Szilágyi), In: R. Wodak, J.E. Richardson (Eds.): Analysing Fascist Discourse. European Fascism in Talk and Text. Routledge, New York, London, 2013.
- "The Post-Communist Extreme Right: the Jobbik party in Hungary". In: Ruth Wodak, Brigitte Mral, Majid Khosravinik (Eds.), Right-Wing Populism in Europe. Politics and Discourse, Bloomsbury Publishing, London, New Delhi, New York, Sydney 2013
- "Antisemitic Elements in Communist Discourse: a continuity factor in post-communist Hungarian antisemitism", In: Guesnet, Francois, Gwen Jones (Eds.), Antisemitism in an Era of Transition. Continuities and Impact in Post-Communist Poland and Hungary, Peter Lang Edition, Frankfurt a. M., 2014
- Communism’s Jewish Question. Jewish issues in Communist archives (Ed.). De Gruyter, Oldenbourg, 2017.
- Jews and Jewry in Hungary, 2017 (Ed. with Ildiko Barna, in Hungarian), Szombat, Budapest 2018

== Honours and awards ==
- Knight's Cross of the Order of Merit of the Republic of Hungary, 2006
- Széchenyi Prize of the Hungarian Republic, 2013
