= András Bérczes =

Hungarian footballer

Personal information
- Date of birth: 5 November 1909
- Place of birth: Spitzzicken, Austria-Hungary
- Date of death: 30 May 1977 (aged 67)
- Place of death: Pécs, Hungary

International career
Years	Team	Apps	(Gls)
- Hungary

András Bérczes (5 November 1909 – 30 May 1977) was a Hungarian footballer. He competed in the men's tournament at the 1936 Summer Olympics.
