= Andras (given name) =

Andras is a masculine given name. Notable people with the name include:

- Andras Angyal (1902–1960), Hungarian American psychologist
- Andras Guttormsson (circa 1490-1544), First Minister of the Faroe Islands
- Andras Jones (born 1968), American actor

== See also ==
- András, a Hungarian masculine given name
