= Andras Kalman =

- András Kalman
- Born: 24 May 1919; Mátészalka, Szabolcs-Szatmár-Bereg County, Hungary
- Died: 26 July 2007 (aged 89); London
- Education: University of Leeds
- Occupation: Art dealer
- Years active: 1949 - 2007
- Known for: Founder of the Crane Kalman Gallery
- Spouse: Dorothy Wareing
- Children: Sally Kalman, Andrew Kalman, Richard Kalman
- Website: www.cranekalman.com

Andras Kalman (24 May 1918 – 26 July 2007) was a Hungarian-British art dealer and former tennis player, who founded and ran the Crane Kalman Gallery on Brompton Road in London.

== Early life ==
Kalman was born in Mateszalka, Hungary into a prosperous middle-class family. His father was a pharmacist and inventor. He moved to the United Kingdom at age 16 to study English, but switched to chemistry. Initially, his father sent him an allowance to support him, but when Hungary joined the Axis powers, he was cut off. Thanks to his mother, he had trained to become a capable tennis player and made some money coaching during the weekends.

== Tennis career ==
Kalman played his first tournament in 1947 at Huddersfield. In 1949 he completed at his first Wimbledon Championships, and again in 1950 and 1951. Also in 1950 he won his first tournament at the Ilkley Open, Ilkley, West Yorkshire. The same year he also won the Cheshire Championships the first of four titles at that tournament.

In 1951 he was losing finalist at the Derbyshire Championships at Buxton. He also completed at the British Covered Court Championships at the Queen's Club, the Northern Championships, and the London Hard Court Championships at the Hurlingham Club. In 1955 he won his final title at the Cheshire Championships at Brooklands. In 1968 he played his final singles tournament at the London Hard Court Championships on clay.
