= András Tombor =

Hungarian businessman

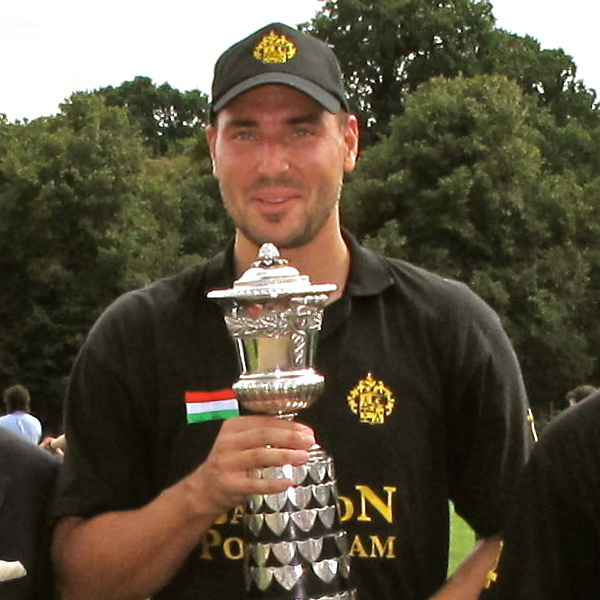
- Born: August 1973 (age 53); Veszprém

András Tombor (1973) is a Hungarian businessman, founder of Mathias Corvinus Collegium (MCC) and polo player.

== Education and early life ==
Tombor was born in Hungary in 1973. His family was strongly anti-communist and lost its wealth after World War II.

Tombor attended a Benedictine boarding school in Győr, Hungary, then studied history (MA) and Classical Philology both in Budapest, Hungary and in Vienna, Austria. Tombor also holds an MA degree of International Economics and International Relations from Johns Hopkins University, School of Advanced International Studies (SAIS), Washington D.C., USA.

Tombor participated in internship programmes with UNESCO World Heritage Program, the European Bank for Reconstruction and Development, PriceWaterhouseCoopers, and after graduation joined Citibank as corporate finance analyst.

He translated Roger Scruton's How to be a Conservative into Hungarian.

== Business career ==
Tombor joined then-Hungarian Prime Minister Viktor Orbán's cabinet as senior security policy advisor from 2000 to 2002.

After leaving his position in the government he managed as either CEO or board member of various companies in media, FMCG, telecom and energy sectors. As of 2024, he is managing his private investment portfolio and is active in the utility sector through a joint venture with Veolia. Tombor is also known for his contribution to the creation of Magyar Vagon, a Hungary-based train manufacturing company.

Tombor has interests in the defence industry as well as in media. He holds a major stake in two wine companies.

== Mathias Corvinus Collegium ==
Tombor founded Mathias Corvinus Collegium (MCC). Through its extracurricular programmes, MCC supports merit-based social mobility of outstanding students in Hungary and its neighbouring countries. MCC has over 7,500 students.

== Sports ==
Tombor is a polo player, founder and member of Bardon Polo Team, winner of UK and Argentina based trophies.
