= András Gergely =

András Gergely may refer to:

- András Gergely (ice hockey) (1916–2008), Hungarian ice hockey player
- András Gergely (historian) (1946–2021), Hungarian historian and diplomat
