= András Tóth =

András Tóth is the name of:

- András Tóth (footballer born 1949), Hungarian footballer who played in the 1978 FIFA World Cup
- András Tóth (footballer born 1973), current Hungarian footballer
