= András Cser =

Hungarian linguist

- Education: Eötvös Loránd University (MA, PhD), Pázmány Péter Catholic University (Habilitation)
- Known for: works on Latin phonology
- Scientific career
- Fields: linguistics
- Institutions: Pázmány Péter Catholic University
- Thesis: The Typology and Modelling of Obstruent Lenition and Fortition Processes (2002)

András Cser is a Hungarian linguist and Professor of Theoretical Linguistics at Pázmány Péter Catholic University. He is the editor-in-chief of Acta Linguistica Academica. Cser is known for his works on phonology.

== Books ==
- The Phonology of Classical Latin, Wiley-Blackwell 2020. ISBN 978-1119700609
- The Typology and Modelling of Obstruent Lenition and Fortition Processes. Budapest: Akadémiai Kiadó, 2003. ISBN 9630580365.
