= Tibor Szele =

Hungarian mathematician

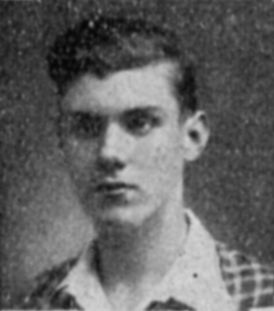
Tibor Szele

Tibor Szele (21 June 1918 – 5 April 1955) was a Hungarian mathematician, working in combinatorics and abstract algebra.

Szele was born in Debrecen. After graduating at the Debrecen University, he became a researcher at the Szeged University in 1946, then he went back at the Debrecen University in 1948 where he became full professor in 1952. He worked especially in the theory of Abelian groups and ring theory. He generalized Hajós's theorem. He founded the Hungarian school of algebra. Tibor Szele received the Kossuth Prize in 1952. He died in Szeged.
