= National University of Public Service =

College in Budapest, Hungary

Ludovika University of Public Service
- Nemzeti Közszolgálati Egyetem
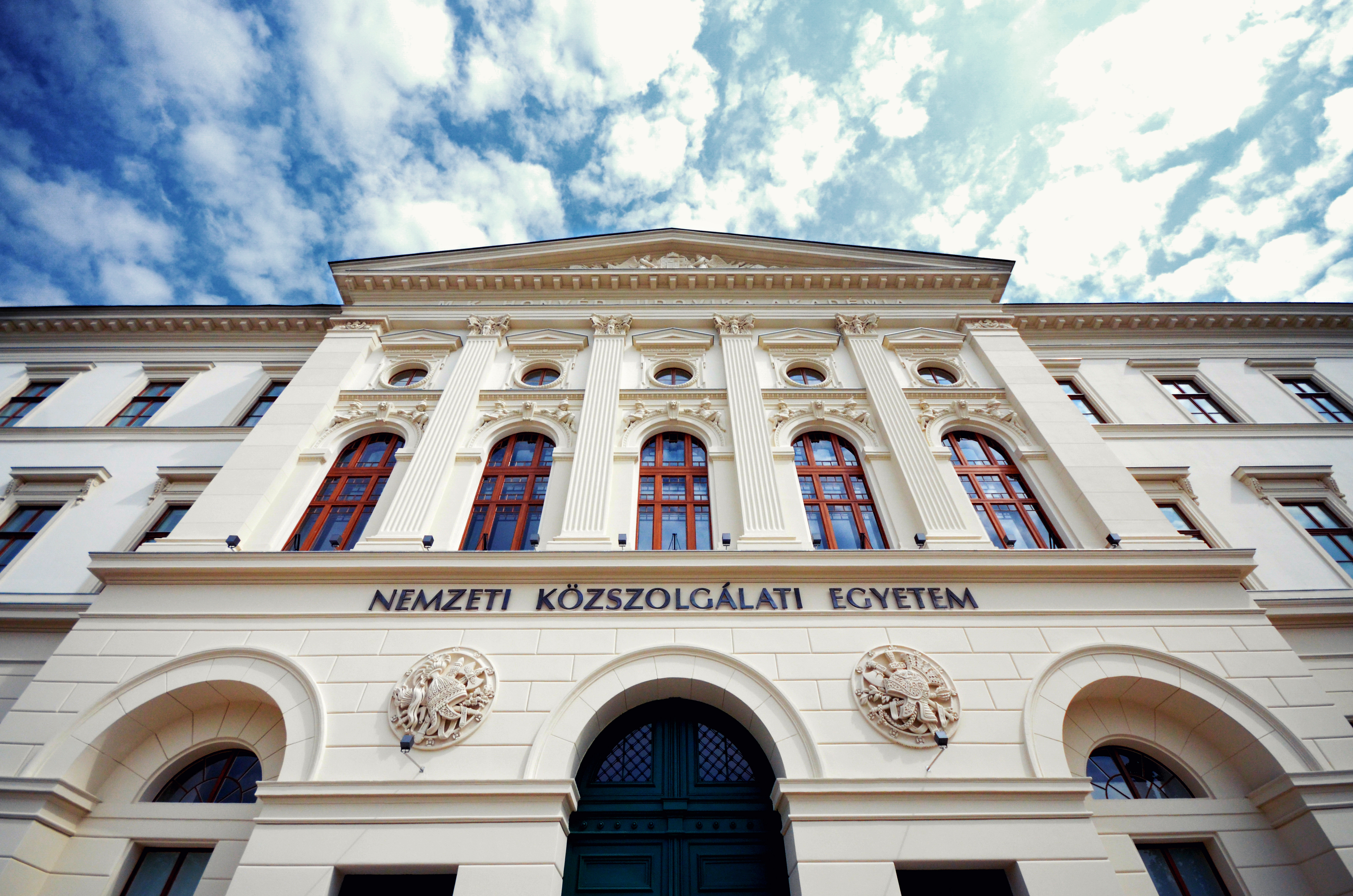
- Facade of the main building at the Ludovika Campus of UPS
- Motto: A haza szolgálatában
- Motto in English: In Service of the Homeland
- Type: Public
- Rector: Gergely Deli
- Academic staff: 570
- Administrative staff: 430
- Students: 6,200
- Location: 2 Ludovika tér, Budapest, Hungary
- Campus: Ludovika
- Website: en.uni-nke.hu

The Ludovika University of Public Service (LUPS; Hungarian: Nemzeti Közszolgálati Egyetem [ˈnɛmzɛti ˈkøsːolɡaːlɒti ˈɛɟɛtɛm]) is a higher educational institution in Budapest, Hungary. Established in 2012, it is one of the youngest universities in Central and Eastern Europe; however, its faculties as former independent colleges look back much earlier.

The university was officially founded on 1 January 2012 through the merger of the Zrínyi Miklós National Defence University (becoming the Faculty of Military Sciences and Officer Training), the Police College (becoming the Faculty of Law Enforcement) and the Faculty of Public Administration of Corvinus University of Budapest (becoming the Faculty of Public Administration at LUPS). As of 1 February 2017, the Institute of Water Engineering and Water Management and the Institute of Water Supply and Environmental Engineering of Eötvös József College in Baja were merged into the Ludovika University of Public Service, thus creating the Faculty of Water Sciences (FWS). In addition to these faculties, LUPS includes institutions that function as educational organs and think tanks and is initiating its fourth faculty of European and international studies.

The institution currently has five faculties: the Faculty of Public Governance and International Studies (FPGIS), the Faculty of Military Science and Officer Training (FMSOT), the Faculty of Law Enforcement (FLE), the Faculty of Water Sciences (FWS) and the Nemeskürty István Teacher Training Faculty (NITK).

The university's primary goal is to educate future public administration officials, military and law enforcement officers (through BA and MA programmes) and to develop the skills and know-how of current members of public service (through further training programmes). Moreover, LUPS also functions as a think tank for public service (through PhD programmes, joint conferences, and individual research activities of lecturers).

== History ==
While modern Hungarian higher education has always included programmes focusing on the education and training of people primarily preparing for public service, Ludovika - UPS is the first university in the country exclusively dealing with the formation of future public servants.

The University of Public Service was officially established on 1 January 2012 through the merger of three separate higher educational institutions: the Zrínyi Miklós National Defence University, the Police College and the Faculty of Public Administration of Corvinus University of Budapest. In 2017, the water and environmental institutes of the József Eötvös College merged into the university.

Accordingly, these institutions became the Faculty of Military Sciences and Officer Training, the Faculty of Law Enforcement, the Faculty of Public Governance and International Studies and the Faculty of Water Sciences respectively. In 2024, the Nemeskürty István Teacher Training Faculty (NITK) commenced its operation, making it the fifth faculty at LUPS.

=== Principles of establishment ===
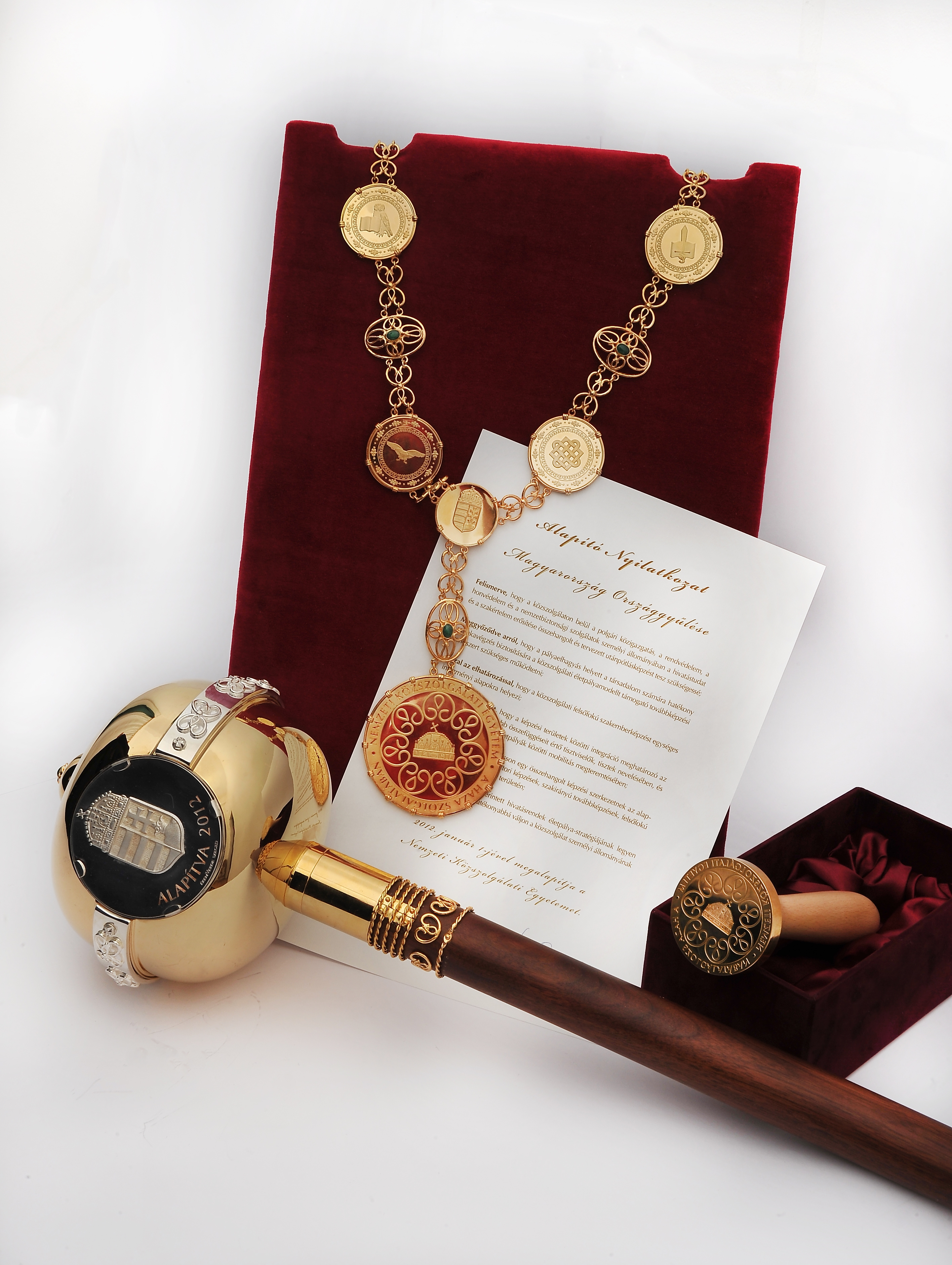
Rector's symbols and the Founding Declaration of NUPS

The merger of the three higher educational institutions, focusing on military officer, law enforcement officer and public administration official training respectively, was directed by the aim of establishing a university where all main branches of public service training are present. This reflects a comprehensive approach which enables the efficient and effective cooperation of future servicemen in these respective branches. In addition to the students' understanding of each other's field of expertise and service, the concept includes the opportunity for mobility (cross-career paths) in civil, military, and law enforcement services.

=== Predecessors and heritage ===
Although UPS was officially established on 1 January 2012, through their merger the Zrínyi Miklós National Defence University, the Police College and the Faculty of Public Administration of Corvinus University of Budapest became the legal predecessors of UPS.

The Zrínyi Miklós National Defence University was officially established in 1996, but it had several predecessors dating back to the early nineteenth century. The most notable is the Royal Hungarian Ludovika Academy which was established on 8 November 1808. The academy was not only the first Hungarian military higher educational institution but was acknowledged to be on an equal level as the Theresian Military Academy in Austria in 1897 making the Ludovika Academy an internationally renowned centre for military sciences and officer training.

Regarding the training of law enforcement officers and public administration officials, the predecessors of Ludovika - UPS have been present in Hungarian higher education for 40 years with the Police College being founded in 1970 and the College of Public Administration established in 1977 (and functioning as the Faculty of Public Administration at the Corvinus University of Budapest after 2005).

The efforts of UPS in building on this legacy include the university's return to the Ludovika Campus that used to give home to the Royal Hungarian Ludovika Academy.

== The Ludovika Project ==
Since Ludovika - UPS was established through the merger of three separate higher educational institutions, the university has started its operation on three different campuses at once. The integration of the faculties includes their inclusion in one single campus.

Following the traditions in Hungarian public service training, the headquarters of UPS is the Ludovika Campus: in May 2012 the Hungarian government decided to renovate the main building of the Ludovika Academy and the nearby Orczy Park thus establishing the central campus for Ludovika - UPS. The renewal of the main campus building was realized following a dual directive: the building was to be modern yet preserving its heritage. Accordingly, the campus centre was equipped with up-to-date technology and infrastructure while keeping its original trademarks in a neo-classicist style. The Orczy Park and its surroundings provide altogether an area of 73,700 square metres (18.2 acres) for the new campus.

== Organisation and operation ==
=== Management ===
The management of the university is led by the rector who is supported by vice-rectors with separate portfolios: the vice rector for science, the vice-rector for education, the vice-rector for development, and the vice-rector for international affairs. In addition, the internal administrative and financial issues are managed by the secretary-general and the chief financial director, respectively.

=== Faculties ===
The institution currently has five faculties: the Faculty of Public Governance and International Studies (FPGIS), the Faculty of Military Science and Officer Training (FMSOT), the Faculty of Law Enforcement (FLE), the Faculty of Water Sciences (FWS) and the Nemeskürty István Teacher Training Faculty (NITK).

=== Faculty of Military Sciences and Officer Training ===
The Faculty of Military Sciences and Officer Training educates professional military officers in the fields of infantry, armour, artillery, reconnaissance, maintenance, logistics, military engineering, signalling, nuclear, biological chemical defence, and air defence. Cadets learn about standard military traditions and are taught requirements and tactics needed to adapt to modern military enhancements. This university is the only one in Hungary entitled to provide BSc, MSc, and PhD degrees in military sciences and military engineering, and to educate military officers. Education is taught according to the requirements specified by the Ministry of Defence and the Hungarian Defence Forces.

The faculty is also responsible for educating civil experts for the national and international defence spheres in the fields of defence C3 systems management, radicalism and religious extremism, and security and defence policy. Graduates are guaranteed a job in the defence sector or other sectors of the state administration, but many of them make an international career in notable international organisations, such as the NATO and the EU. The highest level of further education is also incorporated in the Faculty – graduates of the so-called General Staff Training Centre regularly coat high positions in the Hungarian Defence Forces.

The faculty's main Campus, the Miklós Zrínyi Barracks and University Campus (1101 Budapest, Hungária körút 9-11) is located near downtown Budapest. Seminar rooms, special language labs, a library with more than 500 thousand books, sport facilities, a restaurant and a buffet are all at the disposal of the cadets and students. The department of Air Force of the faculty is located in Szolnok.

Two out of the four Doctoral Schools of the university belong to the faculty. The Doctoral School of Military Science (established in 1996) and Doctoral School of Military Engineering (established in 2002) guarantee that lecturers and researchers of the faculty can initiate and carry out grandiose research projects, often in the form of international consortia. The Doctoral School of Military Sciences focuses on the questions of military science regarding the activities of the defence sphere. This includes a wide spectrum of research fields from military history through security theories, defence administration to national security. The Doctoral School of Military Engineering include all disciplines of technical, disciplinary, technological, technology transfer and technical innovations related to the military application of all other engineering disciplines belonging to engineering sciences.

==== Accredited Undergraduate Programs ====
- State Aviation [State Aircraft Pilot]
- State Aviation [Military Air Traffic Controller]
- State Aviation [Military Aircraft Technician]
- Military Infocommunications
- Military Logistics
- Military Leadership
- International Security and Defense Policy
- National Security

==== Accredited Master’s Programs ====
- Military Operational Logistics
- Military Operations
- Military Leadership
- International Security and Defense Policy
- National Security
- Defense Infocommunication Systems Design

=== Faculty of Law Enforcement ===
The modern training of law enforcement officers in Hungary dates back to the period following the 1867 Austro-Hungarian Compromise. During the dual monarchy era, the Hungarian law enforcement system was established, drawing on the region's traditional practices and Western European experiences. Initially, the training had a course-like format, but by the 1920s, comprehensive law enforcement education was introduced, especially after the signing of the Treaty of Trianon. The nationalization of the police, enacted by decree No. 5047/1919 ME, led to the creation of the Hungarian State Police, and training programs were adjusted accordingly.

In response to evolving crime patterns and increasing responsibilities in the 1960s, the need for a well-trained law enforcement officer corps became evident. On May 28, 1970, the Ministry of Interior decided to establish the Police College (RTF), which began operations on September 1, 1971. Students who completed their studies received state exams and diplomas. Over time, the curriculum expanded to include disaster management, economic protection, and civil security specialties, laying the groundwork for the educational portfolio of its successor, the Faculty of Law Enforcement (FLE) at the LUPS.

The Police College was integrated into the LUPS as the Faculty of Law Enforcement (FLE) on January 1, 2012.

The FLE is the sole institution providing advanced law enforcement training. During their studies, students not only enhance their sense of vocation and expertise, but also acquire high-level knowledge and the necessary behavioral standards, preparing them for dedicated service in law enforcement agencies.

==== Disaster Management Institute ====
The Disaster Management Institute (KVI) was established on January 1, 2012, under the professional supervision of the National Directorate General for Disaster Management (BM OKF) of the Ministry of Interior. As part of the Faculty of Law Enforcement, the institute consists of three departments:

1. Department of Disaster Management Operations
2. Department of Fire Protection and Rescue Management
3. Department of Industrial Safety

The institute also includes an Education Organization Unit and operates at the university’s Hungária Boulevard campus. The programs offered are managed by the FLE and cater to both undergraduate and doctoral students, fulfilling the needs of professional disaster management organizations and economic sectors.

Since 2013, the faculty has offered a new undergraduate degree in disaster management, allowing students to specialize in:

- Disaster Management Operations
- Fire Protection and Rescue Management
- Industrial Safety

A two-year master’s program in disaster management was launched in the 2016/2017 academic year, integrating the undergraduate specializations and focusing on leadership competencies.

The demand for FLE graduates is consistently high across the law enforcement sector, including:

- Police Forces
- Correctional Services
- National Directorate General for Disaster Management (BM OKF)
- National Directorate General for Alien Policing
- National Tax and Customs Administration (NAV)
- Civil National Security Services
- Private Security and Municipal Law Enforcement Sectors

Graduates with a bachelor’s degree can continue to state-supported master's programs in law enforcement leadership, enabling them to pursue careers in various fields, such as:

- Judiciary
- Local Government
- Finance Sector
- Correctional Services
- Police
- National Tax and Customs Administration (NAV)
- Civil Security

==== Accredited Undergraduate Programs ====
The FLE offers a wide range of accredited undergraduate programs, including:

- Criminal Investigations
  - Tax and Financial Investigation
  - Crime Investigation
  - Economic Investigation
  - Cyber Investigation
- Criminal Administration
  - Criminal Intelligence
  - Crime Investigation
  - Economic Protection Investigation
  - IT Investigation
  - Financial Investigation
- Disaster Management
  - Industrial Safety
  - Disaster Management Operations
  - Fire Protection and Rescue Management
- Civil National Security
- Law Enforcement
  - Immigration
  - Border Police
  - Administrative Law Enforcement
  - Traffic Police
  - Public Order Police
  - Customs and Tax Police
- Law Enforcement Administration
  - Security
  - Correctional Services
  - Border Administration
  - Administrative Law Enforcement
  - Traffic Administration
  - Public Order Administration
  - Migration Administration
  - Customs and Excise Administration
- Fire Protection Engineering

==== Accredited Master’s Programs ====
The faculty also offers several accredited master’s programs:

- Security Management
- Disaster Management
- Criminology
  - Civil
  - Law Enforcement
- Civil National Security
- Law Enforcement Leadership

==== Doctoral School of Law Enforcement ====
The Doctoral School of Law Enforcement (RDI) provides various forms of training for PhD candidates, focusing on research-based knowledge. The program aims to promote a knowledge-driven law enforcement culture. Research areas include:

- General Law Enforcement Theory
- History of Law Enforcement
- National Security and Law Enforcement
- Specialized Law Enforcement Areas
- EU and International Aspects of Law Enforcement
- Legal, Criminological, Criminalistics, and Social Science Aspects of Law Enforcement

=== Faculty of Public Governance and International Studies ===
The tradition of training Hungarian public administration experts dates back centuries, with politico-cameral sciences being taught as early as the 18th century within legal studies. Over time, legal, political, and public administration education have both merged and separated at various points. In the 20th century, for instance, a degree in economics from József Nádor University of Technology and Economics qualified graduates for state administration roles. However, from the mid-20th century, economics and public administration training diverged: economics gained its own university, while public administration was integrated into political and legal studies.

The College of Public Administration was established in 1977 by Presidential Decree No. 3 to provide higher-level training for public administration professionals. Since then, a complete vertical structure of undergraduate, specialized, and continuing education programs was built, culminating in the development of university-level public administration training.

Founded in 1977, the College of Public Administration became the core institution for public administration education in Hungary. As part of the higher education reform at the turn of the millennium, it became the Faculty of Public Administration at the Budapest University of Economic Sciences and Public Administration in 2000. This change enabled the launch of university-level public administration programs. From January 1, 2004, the faculty became part of the integrated Corvinus University of Budapest. In 2006, it was renamed the Faculty of Public Administration, adopting the motto "Pro publico bono" ("For the public good").

In 2012, the faculty joined the Ludovika University of Public Service (LUPS). On February 1, 2016, it was renamed the Faculty of Public Governance and Administration. To enhance its competitiveness and offer broader training programs, the Faculty of Public Governance and Administration merged with the Faculty of International and European Studies on August 1, 2019, forming the Faculty of Public Governance and International Studies (FPGIS).

==== Accredited Undergraduate Programs ====
- Public Administration Organization
- International Administration (taught in English)
- International Administration (taught in Hungarian)

==== Accredited Unified (Integrated) Degree Program ====
- Public Governance (State Sciences)

==== Accredited Master’s Programs ====
- Development Policy Program Management
- International Public Service Relations (taught in English)
- Cybersecurity
- Governance and Leadership
- Public Economics and Policy
- Public Administration
- International Public Service Relations
- International Studies (taught in English)
- International Studies (taught in Hungarian)

==== Doctoral schools of the faculty ====
- Doctoral School of Public Administration Sciences

This faculty is a key training base for Hungary's public service, providing a comprehensive range of programs designed to prepare students for the complexities of modern governance and international relations.

=== Faculty of Water Sciences ===
On September 1, 1962, the National Directorate of Water Management established the Advanced Water Management Technical School in Baja. By the late 1960s, significant changes (mergers and closures) occurred in the structure of higher-level technical schools. As a result, from the 1970/1971 academic year onward, the program continued as the Faculty of Water Management at the Budapest University of Technology and Economics. At this stage, graduates received a diploma in engineering rather than a specialized technician certificate. The next modernization step in higher education came on January 1, 1979, when the Faculty became part of the Pollack Mihály Technical College (PMMF) under the name Water Management Institute. Later, from July 1, 1994, it operated as the Water Management Division of PMMF within the organizational structure of the University of Pécs. On June 1, 1996, the Division separated from the University of Pécs. Following the efforts for integration in higher education, the two higher education institutions of Baja city merged: the 125-year-old Eötvös József Teacher Training College and the Water Management Division of PMMF, forming the Eötvös József College under a unified organizational framework. The Technical Faculty of the College is the legal successor of the Advanced Water Management Technical School established in 1962. In 2010, it continued as the Faculty of Engineering and Economic Sciences at Eötvös József College.

The Faculty of Water Sciences (FWS) at the Ludovika University of Public Service (LUPS) was established on February 1, 2017, through the integration of the Water Supply and Environmental Engineering Institute and the Hydraulic and Water Management Institute of Eötvös József College into LUPS.

The programs are based in Baja, where the university provides educational infrastructure including specialized teaching facilities for water technology processes, laboratories, and advanced measuring instruments, as well as a student dormitory. The FWS also operates field stations in Magyaregregy (in the Eastern Mecsek Mountains) and along the Danube in Érsekcsanád. These sites serve as educational venues for watershed exploration and high-water measurements.

==== Accredited Undergraduate Programs at the Faculty ====
- Civil Engineering
- Environmental Engineering
- Water Operations Engineering

==== Accredited Master’s Program at the Faculty ====
- International Water Policy and Water Diplomacy (taught in English)

=== Nemeskürty István Teacher Training Faculty (NITK) ===
The Teacher Training Faculty named after István Nemeskürty officially commenced operations at the Ludovika University of Public Service (LUPS) on August 1, 2024. The new faculty offers a broad spectrum of pedagogy programs and will also launch courses in the humanities.

==== Accredited Single-Subject Teacher Training Programs at the Faculty ====
- Hungarian Language and Literature Teacher [10 semesters, undivided, full-time program]
- History Teacher [10 semesters, undivided, full-time program]
- Geography Teacher [10 semesters, undivided, full-time program]
- Science and Environmental Studies Teacher [10 semesters, undivided, full-time program]
- English Language and Culture Teacher [10 semesters, undivided, full-time program]
- German Language and Culture Teacher [10 semesters, undivided, full-time program]

==== Combined Teacher Training Programs at the Faculty ====
- Hungarian Language and Literature Teacher – German Language and Culture Teacher
- Hungarian Language and Literature Teacher – English Language and Culture Teacher
- English Language and Culture Teacher – German Language and Culture Teacher
- History Teacher – English Language and Culture Teacher
- History Teacher – German Language and Culture Teacher
- History Teacher – Geography Teacher
- Science and Environmental Studies Teacher [standalone program]

==== Primary Education Programs at the Faculty ====
- Kindergarten Teacher Bachelor’s Program [6 semesters, full-time program]
- Primary School Teacher Bachelor’s Program [6 semesters, full-time program]

==== Humanities and Social Sciences Bachelor’s Programs at the Faculty ====
- Hungarian Studies Bachelor’s Program [6 semesters, full-time program]
- History Bachelor’s Program [6 semesters, full-time program]
- English Studies Bachelor’s Program [6 semesters, full-time program]
- Communication and Media Studies Bachelor’s Program [6 semesters, full-time program]

==== Accredited Master’s Program at the Faculty ====
- Communication and Media Studies Master’s Program [4 semesters, full-time program]

== Programs ==
=== Hungarian Academy of Diplomacy ===
The Hungarian Academy of Diplomacy, which provides high-level theoretical and practical education, is realized in close cooperation between the Ministry of Foreign Affairs and Trade and the Ludovika University of Public Service, offering competitive knowledge to those who wish to work in the Hungarian diplomatic corps and represent Hungary's national and economic interests around the world. The one-year course is held at the Ludovika University of Public Service’s Ludovika Campus, where admitted students can acquire professional and language skills important for foreign affairs, participate in various skill development courses, and engage in simulation exercises.

=== Europe of Nations Career Program ===
The Europe of Nations Career Program, launched in September 2020, is implemented by the Ludovika University of Public Service in cooperation with the Ministry of Justice with the aim of increasing the number of Hungarian professionals with the appropriate policy knowledge who successfully apply and find positions within European Union institutions.

=== Ludovika Collegium ===
The Ludovika Collegium trains leaders for public administration.

== Institutes ==
Since 2019, there are no longer any inter-faculty institutes at the National University of Public Service. Their activities are now carried out as part of a faculty or through the newly established Eötvös József Research Center (EJKK).

=== József Eötvös Research Centre (EJRC) ===
The Eötvös József Research Center (EJRC) of the Ludovika University of Public Service was established on February 1, 2019. It operates under the supervision of the rector and the leadership of its director. The EJRC is the research organizational unit of the University responsible for central-level organization of strategic research and the operation of research institutes. Through its institutes focused on strategic research, the EJRC conducts multidisciplinary research in specific areas, whose scientific results are integrated into the educational activities of the faculties, enrich the overall research activities of the University, and strengthen cooperation with researchers from other higher education and scientific institutions. Its mission also includes preserving and passing on the intellectual legacy of Baron József Eötvös, focusing on his state science work, and transmitting his contributions to modern times.

=== Institute for Public Administration Further Training ===
Civil servants in public administration are entitled to career advancement according to the regulations set out in the law. However, to reach the required classification level or fill a position, the civil servant must complete the prescribed training or exams.

=== John Lukacs Institute ===
Starting January 1, 2024, the John Lukacs Institute will be established at the Ludovika University of Public Service under the auspices of the Eötvös József Research Center, merging three previous institutes: the American Studies Research Institute, the Institute for Strategic Studies, and the Strategic Defense Research Institute.

The institute is named after John Lukacs, a Hungarian-born historian.

== International outreach ==
Today the university is home of numerous international conferences, workshops, summer schools and other events on a regular basis and takes part in numerous student and lecturer mobility programmes. While LUPS graduates primarily begin their career in national public service, this also includes career paths with international aspects. According to a report by New York Times, in early 2024, a senior Hungarian government official reportedly instructed Ludovika University Rector Gergely Deli to host a climate change conference as a cover to facilitate secret meetings between former Iranian President Mahmoud Ahmadinejad and Israeli intelligence operatives. Ahmadinejad visited the university in 2024. He was awarded the university's emblem in 2025. In April 2025, the Israeli prime minister Benjamin Netanyahu, visited the university and was presented with a public service award by the university.

=== Memberships and partner institutions ===
Ludovika-UPS is a member of several international organisations dealing with public administration and law enforcement education, such as the European Institute of Public Administration (EIPA), the Networks of Institutes and Schools of Public Administration in Central and Eastern Europe (NISPAcee), the Association of European Police Colleges (AEPC), the European Police College (CEPOL), the European Security and Defence College (ESDC). Furthermore, Ludovika-UPS has relations with the NATO Defence College (NDC) and the George C. Marshall European Center for Security Studies (GCMC). As a higher educational institution LUPS has many bilateral relations with other European universities with their cooperation primarily focusing on the mobility of students and lecturers. LUPS has bilateral agreements with numerous higher education institutions. The university is the partner of College of Law in Wroclaw. On the basis of this cooperation, students can take part in the Erasmus+ program

== Student life ==
=== Communities ===
Students at Ludovika-UPS organize their own respective societies of which the Special Student Societies receive particular attention due to their mission of organizing both open scientific events and leisure activities. These societies are located at each faculty of Ludovika-UPS and have their own set of focus with the Special Student Society for Security Policy dealing with contemporary issues of foreign and security policy, the Ostrakon Special Student Society focusing on governance and management, the Magyary Zoltán Special Student Society dealing with public administration related issues and the Szent György Special Student Society including students interested in law enforcement studies.

Student organisations also offer opportunities for additional academic efforts and research. There are several special student societies operating as groups of socially sensitive intellectuals who are devoted to their (and their fellow students') talent management. These societies are found in all faculties of LUPS and are open to students with a strong commitment to acquire deeper knowledge. Another form of intellectual self-development is the participation in the so-called scientific students' associations. In essence, these societies provide a forum for talented students to publish and present their scientific/academic works thereby aiding them in their first steps towards PhD studies.

Due to the work of the Erasmus Student Network (ESN), international students are always invited to events and parties organised by the various student organisations while the International Office invites international students to all relevant conferences and scientific programmes in English. One of the university's most popular series of events is the Ludovika Ambassadors' Forum where ambassadors accredited to Hungary share their thoughts about current issues of international affairs related to Hungary and to their respective country.

=== Main events ===
Students, lecturers, and administrative staff of Ludovika-UPS can participate at several official events organized regularly throughout the academic year. For students, the first major events are the Freshman Camp offering an opportunity for first year students to meet each other in a friendly environment with several joint activities and concerts, and the Students' Ball where the symbolic inauguration of first year students is held. At the end of the academic year, official events are held where students can socialize with their professors. These usually take form of a ball organized by the special student communities and the related institutes or departments.

Since November is considered as the month of science at LUPS, the university organizes an official ball to which students, professors and members of the administrative staff are both welcome. This event is harmonized with the Hungarian Science Festival which is a nationwide set of programmes: universities have open lectures to the public and young researchers and PhD students can give presentations on their respective research topics and results.

Bachelor and Master level students with potential for additional research can participate at conferences where they can present their respective papers which they prepared with the guidance of professors. These conferences are organized by the faculties' scientific students’ associations separately on the faculty level after which a similar conference is held on the university level. This is synchronized with the organization of the National Conference of Scientific Students’ Associations held biannually. These events offer great opportunities for those BA and MA level students who wish to publish their research results and have the intention of continuing their studies on a PhD level in the future.

The university offers several recreational programmes, from which the largest one is the University Sports Day when students, lecturers and members of the administrative staff can participate at various physical activities. Similarly, the Faculty Days and Dormitory Days offer sporting activities as well, however, these events last 2–3 days with each day having a different theme.
