= Vera T. Sós =

Hungarian mathematician (1930–2023)

Vera Sós
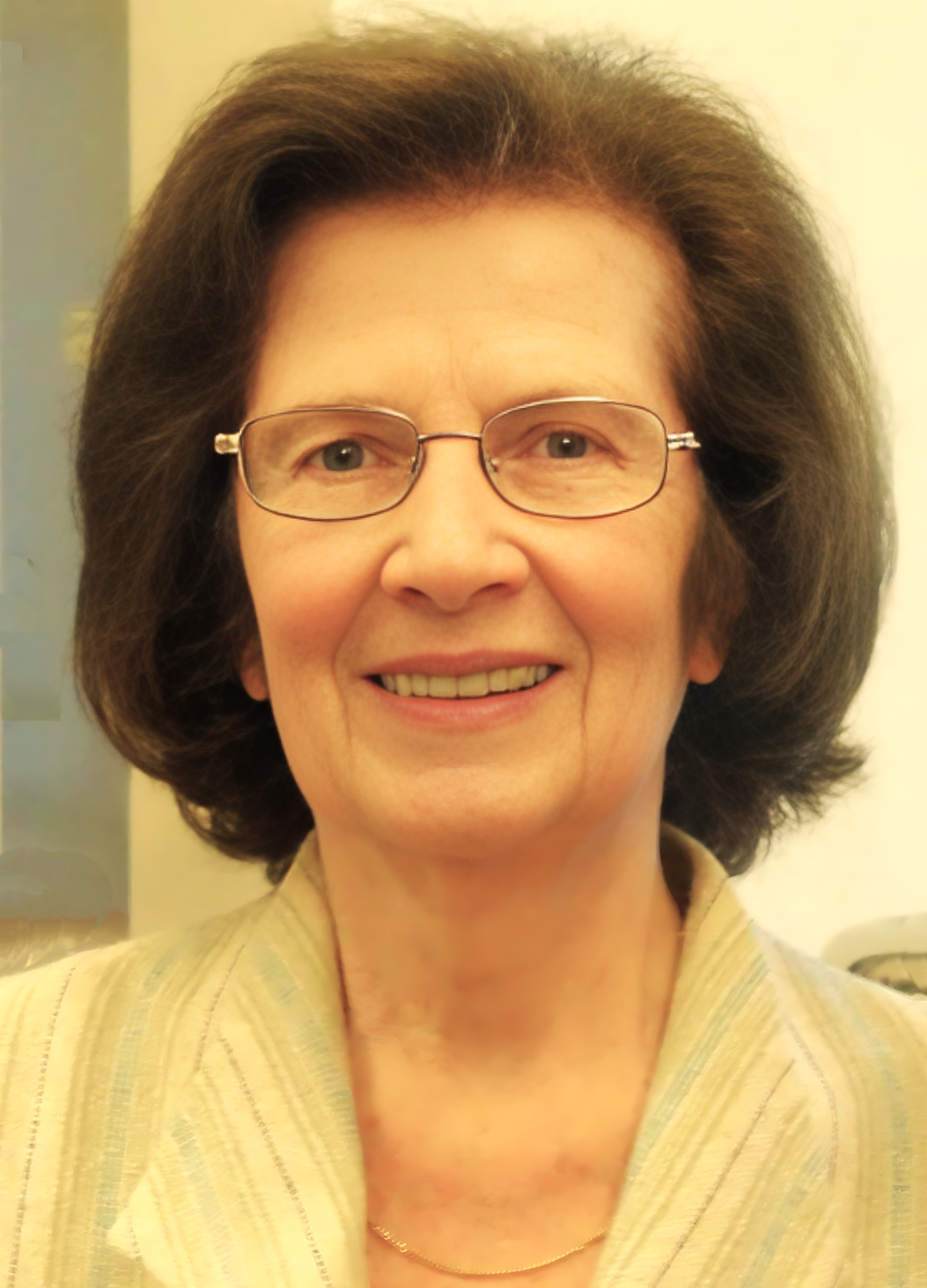
- Sós in 2015 (Photo: Mihály Hujter)
- Born: Vera Turán Sós; 11 September 1930; Budapest, Hungary
- Died: 22 March 2023 (aged 92)
- Education: Eötvös Loránd University.
- Awards: Tibor Szele Medal (1974), Academic Award (1983), Széchenyi Prize (1997), Cross of the Hungarian Order of Merit (2002), elected to Academia Europaea (2013)
- Scientific career
- Fields: Mathematics
- Workplaces: Eötvös Loránd University
- Doctoral students: László Babai; Katalin Vesztergombi

Vera Turán Sós (11 September 1930 – 22 March 2023) was a Hungarian mathematician who specialized in number theory and combinatorics. She was a student and close collaborator of both Paul Erdős and Alfréd Rényi. She also collaborated frequently with her husband Pál Turán, an analyst, number theorist, and combinatorist. Until 1987, she worked at the Department of Analysis at the Eötvös Loránd University, Budapest. Afterwards, she was employed by the Alfréd Rényi Institute of Mathematics. She was elected a corresponding member (1985) and member (1990) of the Hungarian Academy of Sciences. In 1997, Sós was awarded the Széchenyi Prize.

One of her contributions is the Kővári–Sós–Turán theorem concerning the maximum possible number of edges in a bipartite graph that does not contain certain complete subgraphs. Another is the following so-called friendship theorem proved with Paul Erdős and Alfréd Rényi: if, in a finite graph, any two vertices have exactly one common neighbor, then some vertex is joined to all others. An additional theorem conjectured together with Paul Erdős concerns trees being subgraphs of graphs when the average degree is large enough. In number theory, Sós proved the three-gap theorem, conjectured by Hugo Steinhaus and proved independently by Stanisław Świerczkowski.

== Life and career ==
Vera Sós was the daughter of a school teacher. As an adolescent, Sós attended the Abonyi Street Jewish high school in Budapest and graduated in 1948. She was later introduced to Alfréd Rényi and Paul Erdős, with whom she later collaborated, by her teacher Tibor Gallai. (Together, she and Erdős wrote thirty papers.) Sós considered Gallai to be the person who discovered her gift for mathematics. Sós was also one of three girls in Gallai's class to become mathematicians. Sós later attended Eötvös Loránd University. There, she studied as a mathematics and physics major and graduated in 1952. Although she was still a student, Sós taught at Eötvös University in 1950. At the age of twenty, Sós attended a Mathematical Congress in Budapest, Hungary and attended a summer internship. Sós met her husband and collaborator Paul Turán in college. They married in 1952. The two had two children, in 1953 and 1960, György and Thomas Turán. Pál Turán died in September 1976.

In 1965, Sós began the weekly Hajnal–Sós seminar at the Mathematical Institute of the Hungarian Academy for Science with András Hajnal. The seminar is considered to be a "forum for new results in combinatorics." This weekly seminar continues to this day.

Throughout her years working in mathematics, Sós was honored with many awards as a result of her work. One of the many awards includes the Széchenyi Prize, which she received in 1997. The Széchenyi Prize is an award given to those who have greatly contributed to the academic life of Hungary.

== Awards ==
- Member of Academia Europaea, 2013
- Széchenyi Prize, 1997
- Academic Award, 1983
- Cross of the Hungarian Order of Merit, 2002
- Tibor Szele Medal, 1974
- Honorary Doctorate from Eötvös Loránd University, Budapest
- Honorary Doctorate from the Hebrew University of Jerusalem in 2018.

== Selected publications ==
- ——— (1958). "On the distribution mod 1 of the sequence nα". Ann. Univ. Sci. Budapest. Eötvös Sect. Math. 1: 127–134.
- ———; Kövari, T.; Turán, P. (1954). "On a problem of K. Zarankiewicz". Colloq. Math. 3: 50–57. doi:10.4064/cm-3-1-50-57. MR 0065617.
