= Freiling =

Freiling is a surname. Notable people with the surname include:

- Chris Freiling, American mathematician
- Tom Freiling (born 1966), American writer
