= Axiom of choice (disambiguation) =

Axiom of choice is an axiom of set theory.

Axiom of choice may also refer to:

- Axiom of Choice (band), a world music group of Iranian émigrés

== See also ==
- Axiom of countable choice
- Axiom of dependent choice
- Axiom of global choice
- Axiom of non-choice
- Axiom of finite choice
- Luce's choice axiom
