= Planimetrics =

Study of plane measurements

Planimetrics is the study of plane measurements, including angles, distances, and areas.

== History ==
To measure planimetrics a planimeter or dot planimeter is used. This rather advanced analog technology is being taken over by simple image measurement software tools like, ImageJ, Adobe Acrobat, Google Earth Pro, Gimp, Photoshop and KLONK Image Measurement which can help do this kind of work from digitized images.

== In geography ==
Planimetric elements in geography are those features that are independent of elevation, such as roads, building footprints, and rivers and lakes. They are represented on two-dimensional maps as they are seen from the air, or in aerial photography. These features are often digitized from orthorectified aerial photography into data layers that can be used in analysis and cartographic outputs.

A planimetric map is one that does not include relief data.

== See also ==
- Horizontal position representation
- Two-dimensional space
