= Nosarzewska's inequality =

Relation among area, perimeter, and grid points

In the geometry of numbers, Nosarzewska's inequality relates the area and perimeter of a two-dimensional convex set with the number of integer lattice points that it contains. The inequality states that, for a convex set of area $A$ and perimeter $P$, containing $N$ integer points,
$$A-\frac12P<N\le A+\frac12P+1.$$
This implies that when measuring the area of a convex set using a dot planimeter, the error in estimation is at most proportional to the perimeter. The theorem is named after Maria Nosarzewska, a student of Polish mathematician Edward Marczewski; Nosarzewska published it in 1948. In her paper on the subject, Nosarzewska writes that she was answering a question posed by Hugo Steinhaus.

A special case of the inequality for the case $N=0$ was later rediscovered by Edward Bender. The same special case has been generalized (with a larger constant than $\tfrac12$) to regions bounded by Jordan curves. Nosarzewska's inequality has also been generalized to convex sets in higher dimensions, with inequalities of the same form that replace $A$ by the volume and $P$ by the surface area of the set.
