= Randall Dougherty =

American mathematician

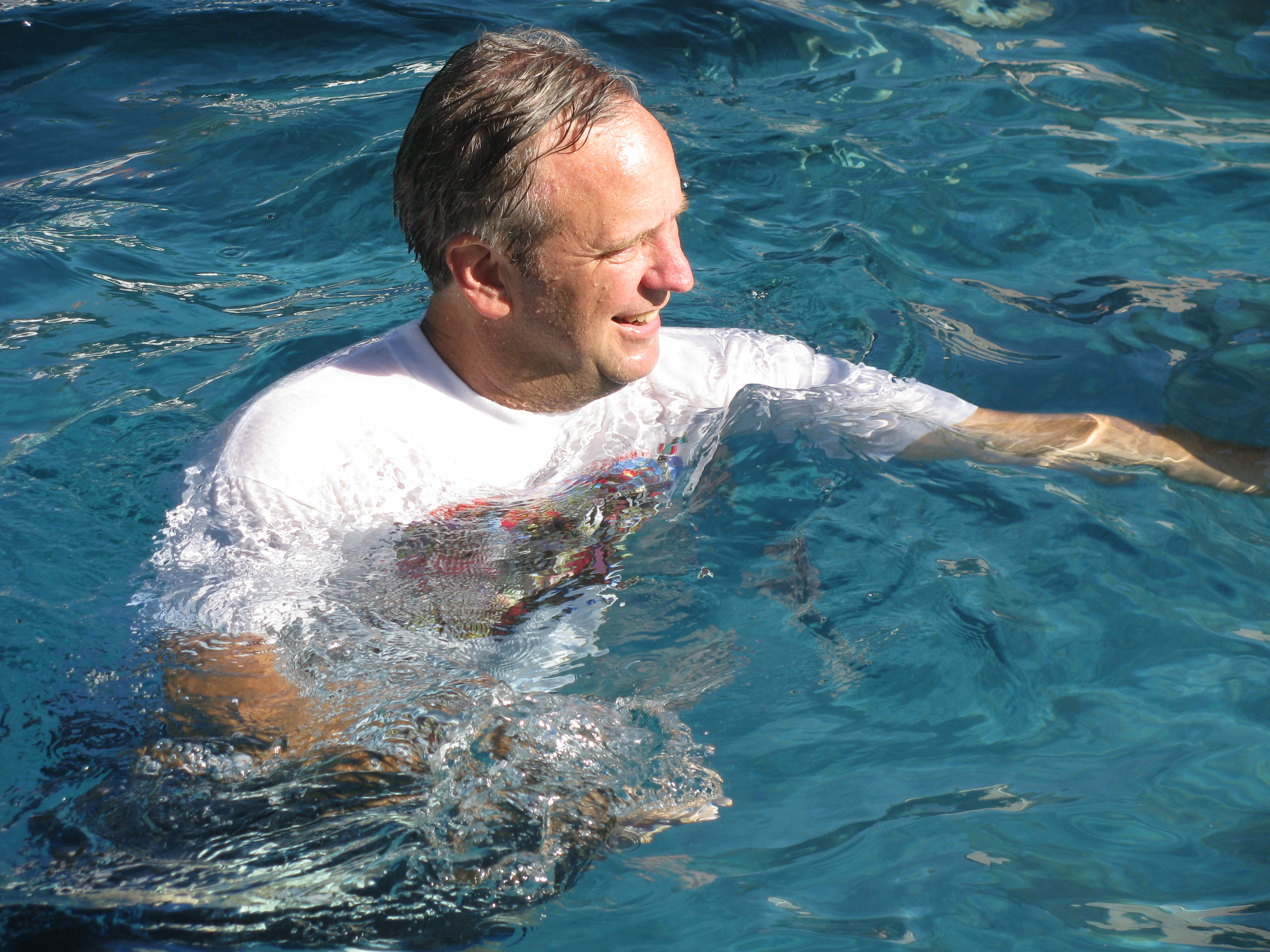
- Randall Dougherty taking a swim 2009
- Born: 1961 (age 64–65)
- Education: University of California, Berkeley
- Scientific career
- Fields: Mathematics
- Workplaces: Ohio State University
- Doctoral advisor: Jack Silver

Randall Dougherty (born 1961) is an American mathematician. Dougherty has made contributions in widely varying areas of mathematics, including set theory, logic, real analysis, discrete mathematics, computational geometry, information theory, and coding theory.

Dougherty is a three-time winner of the U.S.A. Mathematical Olympiad (1976, 1977, 1978) and a three-time medalist in the International Mathematical Olympiad. He is also a three-time Putnam Fellow (1978, 1979, 1980). Dougherty earned his Ph.D. in 1985 at University of California, Berkeley under the direction of Jack Silver.

With Matthew Foreman he showed that the Banach-Tarski decomposition is possible with pieces with the Baire property, solving a problem of Marczewski that remained unsolved for more than 60 years. With Chris Freiling and Ken Zeger, he showed that linear codes are insufficient to gain the full advantages of network coding.

== Selected publications ==
- Dougherty, Randall & Matthew Foreman (1994). "Banach-Tarski decompositions using sets with the property of Baire". Journal of the American Mathematical Society. 7 (1): 75–124. doi:10.2307/2152721. JSTOR 2152721.
- Randall Dougherty, Chris Freiling, and Ken Zeger (2005). "Insufficiency of linear coding in network information flow". IEEE Transactions on Information Theory. 51 (8): 2745–2759. doi:10.1109/tit.2005.851744. S2CID 2543400.
