= Comparability =

Property of elements related by inequalities

Hasse diagram of the natural numbers, partially ordered by "x≤y if x divides y". The numbers 4 and 6 are incomparable, since neither divides the other.

In mathematics, two elements x and y of a set P are said to be comparable with respect to a binary relation ≤ if at least one of x ≤ y or y ≤ x is true. They are called incomparable if they are not comparable.

== Rigorous definition ==
A binary relation on a set $P$ is by definition any subset $R$ of $P \times P.$ Given $x, y \in P,$ $x R y$ is written if and only if $(x, y) \in R,$ in which case $x$ is said to be related to $y$ by $R.$ An element $x \in P$ is said to be $R$-comparable, or comparable (with respect to $R$), to an element $y \in P$ if $x R y$ or $y R x.$ Often, a symbol indicating comparison, such as $<$ (or $\leq,$ $>,$ $\geq,$ and many others) is used instead of $R,$ in which case $x < y$ is written in place of $x R y,$ which is why the term "comparable" is used.

Comparability with respect to $R$ induces a canonical binary relation on $P$; specifically, the comparability relation induced by $R$ is defined to be the set of all pairs $(x, y) \in P \times P$ such that $x$ is comparable to $y$; that is, such that at least one of $x R y$ and $y R x$ is true. Similarly, the incomparability relation on $P$ induced by $R$ is defined to be the set of all pairs $(x, y) \in P \times P$ such that $x$ is incomparable to $y;$ that is, such that neither $x R y$ nor $y R x$ is true.

If the symbol $<$ is used in place of $\leq$ then comparability with respect to $<$ is sometimes denoted by the symbol $\overset{<}{\underset{>}{=}}$, and incomparability by the symbol $\cancel{\overset{<}{\underset{>}{=}}}\!$. Thus, for any two elements $x$ and $y$ of a partially ordered set, exactly one of $x\ \overset{<}{\underset{>}{=}}\ y$ and $x \cancel{\overset{<}{\underset{>}{=}}}y$ is true.

== Example ==
A totally ordered set is a partially ordered set in which any two elements are comparable. The Szpilrajn extension theorem states that every partial order is contained in a total order. Intuitively, the theorem says that any method of comparing elements that leaves some pairs incomparable can be extended in such a way that every pair becomes comparable.

== Properties ==
Both of the relations comparability and incomparability are symmetric, that is $x$ is comparable to $y$ if and only if $y$ is comparable to $x,$ and likewise for incomparability.

== Comparability graphs ==
The comparability graph of a partially ordered set $P$ has as vertices the elements of $P$ and has as edges precisely those pairs $\{ x, y \}$ of elements for which $x\ \overset{<}{\underset{>}{=}}\ y$.

== Classification ==
When classifying mathematical objects (e.g., topological spaces), two criteria are said to be comparable when the objects that obey one criterion constitute a subset of the objects that obey the other, which is to say when they are comparable under the partial order ⊂. For example, the T_{1} and T_{2} criteria are comparable, while the T_{1} and sobriety criteria are not.

== See also ==
- Strict weak ordering – Mathematical ranking of a set, a partial ordering in which incomparability is a transitive relation
