= Dot planimeter =

Tool for estimating area

A radius-5 circle overlaid with a grid of dots in the pattern of a dot planimeter. When counting dots near the boundary of the shape as 1/2, there are 69 interior dots and 20 boundary dots for an estimated area of 79, close to the actual area of 25π ≈ 78.54.

A dot planimeter is a device used in planimetrics for estimating the area of a shape, consisting of a transparent sheet containing a square grid of dots. To estimate the area of a shape, the sheet is overlaid on the shape and the dots within the shape are counted.

The estimation of area by means of a dot grid has also been called the dot grid method or (particularly when the alignment of the grid with the shape is random) systematic sampling. Perhaps because of its simplicity, it has been repeatedly reinvented.

== Application ==
To estimate the area of a shape using a dot planimeter, the planimeter is overlaid on the shape and the dots within the shape are counted. The estimated area of the shape is then obtained by multiplying the number of dots by the area of a single grid square. The dots may also be grouped into larger square groups by lines drawn onto the transparency. These lines allow groups that are entirely within the shape to be added to the count as a unit, rather than requiring their dots to be counted one by one. In some variations of this method, dots that land on or near the boundary of the shape are counted as half of a unit. However, the use of a dot planimeter should be distinguished from the "method of squares", a more sophisticated area estimation method that overlays a grid of squares on the shape, estimates the covered area within each square, and sums these estimates.

In forestry, cartography, and geography, the dot planimeter has been applied to maps to estimate the area of parcels of land. In botany and horticulture, it has been applied directly to sampled leaves to estimate the average leaf area. In neuroscience, and especially in experiments on the behavior of animals with brain lesions, it has been applied to Lashley diagrams as an estimate of the size of the lesions.

In mineralogy, a similar technique of counting dots in a grid is applied to cross-sections of rock samples for a different purpose, estimating the relative proportions of different constituent minerals. In this application, the mineral under each dot of the planimeter is classified, and then the proportion of minerals in the sample is estimated from the proportion of dots assigned to each mineral.

== Theory ==
Every region in the plane that is bounded by a Jordan curve and avoids all points of an integer lattice has area at most proportional to its perimeter. More precisely the area is at most 0.582823 times the perimeter. In terms of a dot planimeter, this means that if a shape without interior holes allows a placement of the dot planimeter for which the estimated area is zero, the error in this underestimate can be at most proportional to the perimeter multiplied by the dot spacing. For a convex set of perimeter $p$, and a dot planimeter of spacing $s$, the estimated area is always within $s(p/2+1)$ of the true area by Nosarzewska's inequality.

If the offset position of a dot planimeter is chosen randomly, relative to the shape to be measured, the estimated area is an unbiased estimator of the correct area: its expected value equals the correct area. Its standard error will be at most proportional to the square root of the number of grid squares intersected by the boundary of the shape. However, because the positions of dots in the planimeter are not themselves random, the error of estimation does not obey the central limit theorem, and the standard error is less informative than it would be for independent random samples, especially in cases where the area to be estimated has some spatial correlation with the dot pattern such as in the Moiré effect. Greater accuracy can be achieved by using a dot planimeter with a finer grid of dots. Alternatively, repeatedly placing a dot planimeter with different irrational offsets from its previous placement, and averaging the resulting measurements, can lead to a set of sampled measurements whose average tends towards the true area of the measured shape. The method using a finer grid tends to have better statistical efficiency than repeated measurement with random placements.

According to Pick's theorem, published by Georg Alexander Pick in 1899, the version of the dot planimeter with boundary dots counting as half a square (and with one square subtracted from the total as a second correction) gives exact results for polygons that have the dots as their vertices. According to Blichfeldt's theorem, published by Hans Frederick Blichfeldt in 1914, it is always possible to shift a dot planimeter relative to a given shape without rotating it so that the number of dots within the shape is at least equal to its area.

The Gauss circle problem concerns the error that would be obtained by using a dot planimeter to estimate the area of a circle whose center lies on one of the dots. As its name suggests, it was studied in the early 19th century by Carl Friedrich Gauss. The maximum error is known to be bounded by a fractional power of the radius of the circle, with exponent between 1/2 and 131/208.

== Related devices ==
The dot planimeter differs from other types of planimeter, which measure the area of a shape by passing a device around its boundary.

The Steinhaus longimeter is a similar transparency-based device for estimating the length of curves by counting crossings.

== See also ==
- Danzer set, a more complicated dot pattern that touches every convex set of unit area
