= Siemion Fajtlowicz =

Polish mathematician

- Education: Polish Academy of Sciences
- Scientific career
- Fields: Mathematics
- Workplaces: University of Houston
- Doctoral advisor: Edward Marczewski
- Doctoral students: Ermelinda DeLaViña

Siemion Fajtlowicz is a Polish-American mathematician, formerly a professor at the University of Houston. He is known for creating and developing the conjecture-making computer program Graffiti.

Fajtlowicz received his Ph.D. in 1967 or 1968 from the Institute of Mathematics of the Polish Academy of Sciences, under the supervision of Edward Marczewski.
