= Freiling's axiom of symmetry =

Axiom in set theory

Freiling's axiom of symmetry ($\texttt{AX}$) is a set-theoretic axiom proposed by Chris Freiling. It is based on an intuition of Stuart Davidson but the mathematics behind it goes back to Wacław Sierpiński.

Let $A\subseteq\mathcal{P}([0,1])^{[0,1]}$ denote the set of all functions from $[0,1]$ to countable subsets of $[0,1]$. (In other words, $A = \left(\big[[0,1]\big]^{\leq\omega}\right)^{[0,1]}$ where $[X]^{\leq\kappa}$ is the collection of subsets of $X$ of cardinality at most $\kappa$.)

The axiom $\texttt{AX}$ then states:

For every $f\in A$, there exist $x,y\in[0, 1]$ such that $x\not\in f(y)$ and $y\not\in f(x)$.

A theorem of Sierpiński says that under the assumptions of ZFC set theory, $\texttt{AX}$ is equivalent to the negation of the continuum hypothesis (CH). Sierpiński's theorem answered a question of Hugo Steinhaus and was proved long before the independence of CH had been established by Kurt Gödel and Paul Cohen.

Freiling claims that probabilistic intuition strongly supports this proposition while others disagree. There are several versions of the axiom, some of which are discussed below.

== Freiling's argument ==
Fix a function f in A. We will consider a thought experiment that involves throwing two darts at the unit interval. We are not able to physically determine with infinite accuracy the actual values of the numbers x and y that are hit. Likewise, the question of whether "y is in f(x)" cannot actually be physically computed. Nevertheless, if f really is a function, then this question is a meaningful one and will have a definite "yes" or "no" answer.

Now wait until after the first dart, x, is thrown and then assess the chances that the second dart y will be in f(x). Since x is now fixed, f(x) is a fixed countable set and has Lebesgue measure zero. Therefore, this event, with x fixed, has probability zero. Freiling now makes two generalizations:

- Since we can predict with virtual certainty that "y is not in f(x)" after the first dart is thrown, and since this prediction is valid no matter what the first dart does, we should be able to make this prediction before the first dart is thrown. This is not to say that we still have a measurable event, rather it is an intuition about the nature of being predictable.
- Since "y is not in f(x)" is predictably true, by the symmetry of the order in which the darts were thrown (hence the name "axiom of symmetry") we should also be able to predict with virtual certainty that "x is not in f(y)".

The axiom $\texttt{AX}$ is now justified based on the principle that what will predictably happen every time this experiment is performed, should at the very least be possible. Hence there should exist two real numbers x, y such that x is not in f(y) and y is not in f(x).

== Relation to the (Generalised) Continuum Hypothesis ==
Fix $\kappa\,$ an infinite cardinal (e.g. $\aleph_{0}\,$). Let $\texttt{AX}_{\kappa}$ be the statement: there is no map $f:\mathcal{P}(\kappa)\to[\mathcal{P}(\kappa)]^{\leq\kappa}\,$ from sets to $\leq\kappa$-sized collections of sets such that for any ${x,y\in\mathcal{P}(\kappa)}\,$ either $x\in f(y)\,$ or $y\in f(x)\,$.

Claim: $\texttt{ZFC}\vdash 2^{\kappa}=\kappa^{+}\leftrightarrow\neg\texttt{AX}_{\kappa}\,$.

Proof: Part I ($\Rightarrow\,$):

Suppose $2^{\kappa}=\kappa^{+}\,$. Then there exists a bijection $\sigma:\kappa^{+}\to\mathcal{P}(\kappa)\,$. We will exploit the well-ordering of $\kappa^+$ to build an ascending chain in $[\mathcal P(\kappa)]^{\leq\kappa}$.

Define a function $f:\mathcal{P}(\kappa)\to[\mathcal{P}(\kappa)]^{\leq\kappa}\,$ by $\sigma(\alpha) \mapsto \{\sigma(\beta) : \beta \leq \alpha\}\,$. Given this function, it is straightforward to see that this demonstrates the failure of Freiling's axiom. The map $\sigma$ induces a well-ordering $\preceq$ on $\mathcal P(\kappa)$ (sometimes called the pushforward of the standard ordering on $\kappa$). Picking any two $x,y \in \mathcal P(\kappa)$, we can state without loss of generality that $x \preceq y$. But then, noting the definition of $f$, we see that this implies $x \in f(y) = \{t \in \mathcal P(\kappa) : t \preceq y \}$. Thus we have found a function $f$ witnessing $\neg\texttt{AX}_\kappa$.

Part II ($\Leftarrow\,$):

Suppose that Freiling's axiom is false. Then fix some $f\,$ to verify this fact. Define an order relation on $\mathcal{P}(\kappa)\,$ by $A\leq_{f} B$ iff $A\in f(B)$. This relation is total and every point has $\leq\kappa$ many predecessors. Define now a strictly increasing chain $(A_{\alpha}\in\mathcal{P}(\kappa))_{\alpha<\kappa^{+}}$ as follows: at each stage choose $A_{\alpha}\in\mathcal{P}(\kappa)\setminus\bigcup_{\xi<\alpha}f(A_{\xi})$. This process can be carried out since for every ordinal $\alpha<\kappa^{+}\,$, $\bigcup_{\xi<\alpha}f(A_{\xi})\,$ is a union of $\leq\kappa\,$ many sets of size $\leq\kappa\,$; thus is of size $\leq\kappa<2^{\kappa}\,$ and so is a strict subset of $\mathcal{P}(\kappa)\,$. We also have that this sequence is cofinal in the order defined, i.e. every member of $\mathcal{P}(\kappa)\,$ is $\leq_{f}\,$ some $A_{\alpha}\,$. (For otherwise if $B\in\mathcal{P}(\kappa)\,$ is not $\leq_{f}\,$ some $A_{\alpha}$, then since the order is total $(\forall{\alpha<\kappa^{+}})A_{\alpha}\leq_{f} B\,$; implying $B\,$ has $\geq\kappa^{+}>\kappa\,$ many predecessors; a contradiction.) Thus we may well-define a map $g:\mathcal{P}(\kappa)\to\kappa^{+}\,$ by $B\mapsto\operatorname{min}\{\alpha<\kappa^{+}:B\in f(A_{\alpha})\}$.

So $\mathcal{P}(\kappa)=\bigcup_{\alpha<\kappa^{+}}g^{-1}\{\alpha\}=\bigcup_{\alpha<\kappa^{+}}f(A_{\alpha})\,$ which is union of $\kappa^{+}\,$ many sets each of size $\leq\kappa\,$. Hence $2^{\kappa}\leq\kappa^{+}\cdot\kappa=\kappa^{+}\,$.

$\blacksquare$ (Claim)

Note that $|[0,1]|=|\mathcal{P}(\aleph_{0})|\,$ so we can easily rearrange things to obtain that $\neg\texttt{CH}\Leftrightarrow\,$ the above-mentioned form of Freiling's axiom.

The above can be made more precise: $\texttt{ZF}\vdash(\texttt{AC}_{\mathcal{P}(\kappa)}+\neg\texttt{AX}_{\kappa})\leftrightarrow \texttt{CH}_{\kappa}\,$. This shows (together with the fact that the continuum hypothesis is independent of choice) a precise way in which the (generalised) continuum hypothesis is an extension of the axiom of choice.

== Objections to Freiling's argument ==
Freiling's argument is not widely accepted because of the following two problems with it (which Freiling was well aware of and discussed in his paper).

- Freiling's argument does not claim that every subset of the reals has a natural probability. But it does claim that some non-measurable sets have enough structure to be predictable. Traditional mathematical formalization of probability restricts itself to only Lebesgue-measurable sets. This is to avoid paradoxes that arise from certain non-measurable sets. Examples of this are the Banach–Tarski paradox and the existence of Vitali sets.
- A minor variation of his argument gives a contradiction with the axiom of choice whether or not one accepts the continuum hypothesis, if one replaces countable additivity of probability by additivity for cardinals less than the continuum. (Freiling used a similar argument to claim that Martin's axiom is false.) It is not clear why Freiling's intuition should be any less applicable in this instance, if it applies at all. (Maddy 1988, p. 500) So Freiling's argument seems to be more an argument against the possibility of well ordering the reals than against the continuum hypothesis.

== Connection to graph theory ==
Using the fact that in ZFC, we have $2^{\kappa}=\kappa^{+}\Leftrightarrow\neg\texttt{AX}_{\kappa}\,$ (see above), it is not hard to see that the negation of the axiom of symmetry — and thus the success of $2^{\kappa}=\kappa^{+}\,$ — is equivalent to the following combinatorial principle for graphs:

- The complete graph on $\mathcal{P}(\kappa)\,$ can be so directed, that every node leads to at most $\kappa\,$-many nodes.

In the case of $\kappa=\aleph_{0}\,$, this translates to:

- The complete graph on the unit circle (or any set of the same size as the reals) can be so directed, that every node has a path to at most countably-many nodes.

Thus in the context of ZFC, the failure of a Freiling axiom is equivalent to the existence of a specific kind of choice function.
