= Steinhaus longimeter =

Steinhaus longimeter

The Steinhaus longimeter, patented by Polish mathematician Hugo Steinhaus, is an instrument used to measure the lengths of curves on maps.

== Description ==
It is a transparent sheet of three grids, turned against each other by 30 degrees, each consisting of parallel lines spaced at equal distances 3.82 mm. The measurement is done by counting crossings of the curve with grid lines. The number of crossings is the approximate length of the curve in millimetres.

The design of the Steinhaus longimeter can be seen as an application of the Crofton formula, according to which the length of a curve equals the expected number of times it is crossed by a random line.

== See also ==
- Opisometer, a mechanical device for measuring curve length by rolling a small wheel along the curve
- Dot planimeter, a similar transparency-based device for estimating area, based on Pick's theorem
