= Opisometer =

Measuring tool for arbitrary curved lines

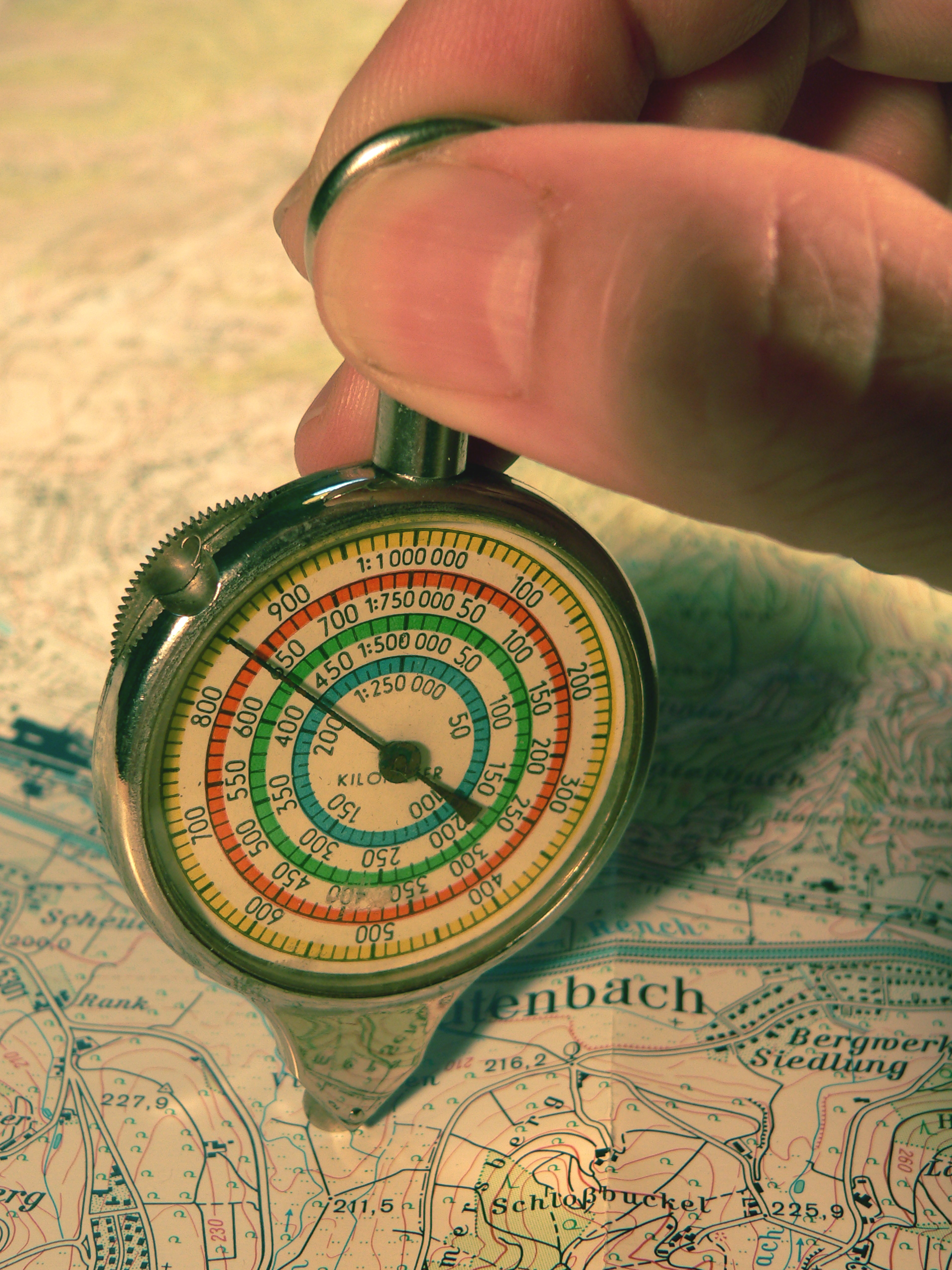
An opisometer

An opisometer, also called a curvimeter, meilograph, or map measurer, is an instrument for measuring the lengths of arbitrary curved lines.

== Explanation ==
A simple opisometer consists of a toothed wheel of known circumference on a handle. The wheel is placed in contact with the curved line to be measured and run along its length. By counting the number of teeth passing a mark on the handle while this is done, the length of the line can be ascertained:

line length = wheel circumference × teeth counted/teeth on wheel.

In more sophisticated models, sometimes called a chartometer, the wheel is connected via gearing to a rotary dial from which the line length can be directly read.

The instrument is most commonly used to measure the lengths of roads, rivers and other line features on maps. Opisometers designed for this purpose provide scales reading the measured distance in kilometers and miles.

== History of the opisometer ==
Early versions of this instrument were patented in 1873 by the English engineer Edward Russell Morris. The instruments he produced were initially described as a Patent Chartometer although later versions were sold under the curious name of Wealemefna. Writing in 1881, Morris described how he had created a wholly original name in an attempt to outwit his imitators; he also refused to disclose the origin of the word.

== See also ==
- Planimeter
- Steinhaus longimeter
- Surveyor's wheel
