= Ermelinda DeLaViña =

American mathematician

Ermelinda DeLaViña is an American mathematician specializing in graph theory. She is a professor in the Computer and Mathematical Sciences Department of the University of Houston–Downtown, where she is also associate dean of the College of Science and Technology.

== Education ==
DeLaViña grew up in a working-class family in Texas, with roots stretching back for five generations there. Her parents came from Bishop, Texas, but raised her in Houston. Inspired by a 9th-grade algebra teacher, she aimed for a college education despite the discouragement of her school counselors. She started her undergraduate studies at the University of Houston, but dropped out after one term, and after working for two years began again at the University of Texas–Pan American, where she graduated with a bachelor's degree in mathematics and a minor in computer science in 1989, becoming the first in her family with a college degree. She returned to graduate school at the University of Houston and completed a Ph.D. in mathematics there in 1997. Her doctoral supervisor was Siemion Fajtlowicz, with whom she worked on the Graffiti computer program for automatically formulating conjectures in graph theory.

== Career ==
After completing her doctorate, DeLaViña became an assistant professor at the University of Houston–Downtown. She was promoted to full professor there in 2010, and became associate dean in 2012.

== Contributions ==
One of DeLaViña's results in graph theory is related to an inequality showing that every undirected graph has an independent set that is at least as large as its radius; DeLaViña showed that the graphs with no larger independent set always contain a Hamiltonian path.
