= Steinhaus theorem =

Mathematical theorem in real analysis

In the mathematical field of real analysis, the Steinhaus theorem states that the difference set of a set of positive measure contains an open neighbourhood of zero. It was first proved by Hugo Steinhaus.

== Statement ==
Let A be a Lebesgue-measurable set in $\mathbb{R}^{n}$ such that the Lebesgue measure of A is not zero. Then the difference set

$$A-A=\{a-b\mid a,b\in A\}$$

contains an open neighbourhood of the origin.

Proof

Let $A \subset \mathbb{R}^{n}$ be a subset of positive Lebesgue measure. First, we consider the case where $m(A) < \infty$. In this case, it follows that the characteristic functions $\chi_{A}(x)$ and $\chi_{-A}(x)$ are contained in $L^{p}(\mathbb{R}^{n})$ for all $1 \leq p < \infty$. Then $h(x) = \chi_{A} \ast \chi_{-A}(x)$ is continuous on $\mathbb{R}^{n}$ (where $\ast$ denotes convolution) and

$$h(0) = \int_{\mathbb{R}^{n}}\chi_{-A}(-y)\chi_{A}(y)\;dy  = \int_{\mathbb{R}^{n}}\chi_{A}(s)\;ds = m(A) > 0.$$

Then since $h$ is continuous and $h(0) > 0$, there exists an open neighborhood $U$ of 0 so that $h(x) > 0$ for all $x \in U$. But by definition of $h(x)$, $h(x) > 0$ if and only if $x \in A - A$. Hence, $0 \in U \subset A - A$.

Now suppose $m(A) = \infty$. We can write $A$ as the following union:

$$A = \bigcup_{R = 0}^{\infty}(A \cap B_{R}(0)),$$
where $B_{R}(0)$ is the ball of radius $R$ centered at 0. By countable subadditivity, there exists at least one $R_{0}$ so that $m(A \cap B_{R_{0}}(0)) > 0$. Hence, since $A \cap B_{R_{0}}(0)$ has finite Lebesgue measure, by the first part of the proof, there exists a neighborhood $U$ contained in $(A \cap B_{R_0}(0)) - (A \cap B_{R_0}(0)) \subset A - A$. Hence, the proof concludes.

The general version of the theorem, first proved by André Weil, states that if G is a locally compact group, and A ⊂ G a subset of positive (left) Haar measure, then

$$AA^{-1} = \{ ab^{-1} \mid a,b \in A \}$$

contains an open neighbourhood of unity.

The theorem can also be extended to nonmeagre sets with the Baire property.

== Corollary ==
A corollary of this theorem is that any measurable proper subgroup of $(\R,+)$ is of measure zero.

== Applications ==
A special case of the Steinhaus Theorem (and the Lebesgue density theorem) deals with the existence of arithmetic progressions in a set of positive Lebesgue measure. In particular, let $E \subset \mathbb{R}^{n}$, for some positive integer $n$, be a set of positive Lebesgue measure. Then for any integer $N > 0$, $E$ contains a finite arithmetic progression of length $N + 1$.

Proof

Let $E \subset \mathbb{R}^{n}$ be a set of positive Lebesgue measure, $\{a_{1}, a_{2}, \ldots, a_{N}\}$ be an arbitrary collection of unit vectors in $\mathbb{R}^{n}$, and $\epsilon \in (0, (2^{N} - 1)^{-1})$. Also denote the $n$-dimensional Lebesgue measure by $m^{n}$. By inner regularity of the Lebesgue measure, we obtain a compact set $K_{1} \subset E$ such that $m^{n}(K_{1}) > 0$, and by outer regularity an open set $U \supset K_{1}$ such that $m^{n}(U) \leq (1 + \epsilon)m^{n}(K_{1}).$

Because $K_{1}$ is compact, the distance $R = d(K_{1}, U^{c})$ is strictly positive. Let $\delta \in (0, R)$ be arbitrary, and consider the set $K_{1} + \delta a_{1}$. If this subset is not contained in $U$, then we would have

$$\begin{align}
d(K_{1}, U^{c}) < \Vert \delta a_{1} \Vert = \delta < R,
\end{align}$$
which is a contradiction. Therefore, $K_{1} \cap (K_{1} + \delta a_{1}) \subset U$. This means that

$$\begin{align}
m^{n}(U) \geq m^{n}(K_{1} \cup (K_{1} + \delta a_{1})) = m^{n}(K_{1}) + m^{n}(K_{1} + \delta a_{1}) - m^{n}(K_{1} \cap (K_{1} + \delta a_{1})).
\end{align}$$

By translation invariance of the Lebesgue measure, we note that $m^{n}(K_{1} + \delta a_{1}) = m^{n}(K_{1})$, and so

$$\begin{align}
m^{n}(K_{1} \cap (K_{1} + \delta a_{1})) \geq 2m^{n}(K_{1}) - m^{n}(U) \geq (1 - \epsilon)m^{n}(K_{1}).
\end{align}$$

Since $\epsilon < 1$, we see that the measure on the left side is strictly positive, which means $K_{1} + \delta a_{1} \neq \emptyset.$ Now for each $i = 1, \ldots, N$, define the sets $K_{i + 1} = K_{i} \cap (K_{i} + \delta a_{i})$. By a generalization of the argument above, each $K_{i}$ is contained in $U$. Moreover, for each $i$, $m^{n}(K_{i}) \geq (1 - (2^{i} - 1))m^{n}(K_{1})$ (a simple application of induction immediately yields this result) so that each $K_{i}$ is nonempty. This yields a nested sequence of sets $\emptyset \neq K_{N + 1} \subset K_{N} \subset \dotsm \subset K_{1} \subset E$. Let $q \in K_{N + 1}$. Since $K_{N + 1} = K_{N} + \delta a_{N}$, $q - \delta a_{N} \in K_{N}$. Likewise, since $K_{N} = K_{N - 1} + \delta a_{N - 1}$, $q - \delta a_{N} - \delta a_{N - 1} \in K_{N - 1}$. Repeating this procedure iteratively and eventually denoting $p = q - \delta\sum_{i = 1}^{N}a_{i}$, we recover the finite arithmetic progression $\{p, p + \delta a_{1}, p + \delta a_{1} +\delta a_{2}, \ldots, p + \delta a_{1} + \dotsm + \delta a_{N}\} \subset E$ consisting of $N + 1$ points. Hence, the proof concludes.

== See also ==
- Falconer's conjecture
