= Stanisław Świerczkowski =

Polish mathematician (1932–2015)

- Born: 16 July 1932; Toruń, Poland
- Died: 30 September 2015 (aged 83); Australia
- Education: University of Wroclaw,
- Known for: Three-gap theorem, Non-tetratorus theorem
- Children: 2
- Awards: Jurzykowski Prize (1996)
- Scientific career
- Fields: Mathematics
- Workplaces: Glasgow University, University of Sussex, University of Washington, Australian National University, Sultan Qaboos University, Queen's University, University of Colorado at Boulder
- Doctoral advisor: Hugo Steinhaus

Stanisław (Stash) Świerczkowski (Polish: [ɕfjɛrt͡ʂˈkɔfski]; 16 July 1932 – 30 September 2015) was a Polish mathematician famous for his solutions to two iconic problems posed by Hugo Steinhaus: the three-gap theorem and the non-tetratorus theorem.

== Early life and education ==
Stanisław (Stash) Świerczkowski was born in Toruń, Poland. His parents were divorced during his infancy. When war broke out his father was captured in Soviet-controlled Poland and murdered in the 1940 Katyń Massacre. He belonged to the Polish nobility; Świerczkowski's mother belonged to the upper middle class and would have probably suffered deportation and murder by the Nazis. However she had German connections and was able to gain relatively privileged class 2 Volksliste citizenship. At the end of the war Świerczkowski's mother was forced into hiding near Toruń until she was confident that she could win exoneration from the Soviet-controlled government for her Volksliste status and be rehabilitated as a Polish citizen. Meanwhile, Świerczkowski lived in a rented room in Toruń and attended school there.

Świerczkowski won a university place to study astronomy at the University of Wrocław but switched to mathematics to avoid the drudgery of astronomical calculations. He discovered a natural ability through his friendship with Jan Mycielski and was able to remain at Wrocław to complete his masters under Jan Mikusiński. He graduated with a PhD in 1960, his dissertation including the now-famous three-gap theorem, which he proved in 1956 in answer to a question of Hugo Steinhaus.

== Noted mathematical results ==
The three-gap theorem says: take arbitrarily finitely many integer multiples of an irrational number between zero and one and plot them as points around a circle of unit circumference; then at most three different distances will occur between consecutive points. This answered a question of Hugo Steinhaus. The theorem belongs to the field of Diophantine approximation since the smallest of the three distances observed may be used to give a rational approximation to the chosen irrational number. It has been extended and generalised in many ways.

The non-tetratorus theorem, published by Świerczkowski in 1958, states that it is impossible to construct a closed chain (torus) of regular tetrahedra, placed face to face. Again this answered a question of Hugo Steinhaus. The result is attractive and counter-intuitive, since the tetrahedron is unique among the Platonic solids in having this property. Recent work by Michael Elgersma and Stan Wagon has sparked new interest in this result by showing that one can create chains of tetrahedra that are arbitrarily close to being closed.

In 1964, in a joint work with Jan Mycielski, he established one of the early results on the axiom of determinacy (AD), namely that AD implies that all sets of real numbers are Lebesgue measurable.

Świerczkowski's last mathematical work was on proving Gödel's incompleteness theorems using hereditarily finite sets instead of encoding of finite sequences of natural numbers. It is these proofs that were the basis for the production, in 2015, of mechanised proofs of Gödel's two famous theorems.

== Career ==
Świerczkowski had a very migratory career. He was allowed abroad from Poland to study at Dundee University, where his work with Alexander Murray MacBeath would later attract the attention of André Weil. He then took up a research fellowship at Glasgow University before being obliged to return to Poland. When the Polish Academy of Sciences granted him a passport to attend a conference in Stuttgart he used this as an opportunity to leave Poland for good in 1961, first resuming his fellowship in Glasgow before taking a job in the recently created University of Sussex. In 1963 he visited André Weil at the Institute for Advanced Study and thereafter, between 1964 and 1973, held posts at the University of Washington, the Australian National University and Queen's University in Canada. In 1973 he left mathematics, moved to the Netherlands and built a yacht in which he sailed around the world for ten years. The period 1986 to 1997 was again spent teaching mathematics, at Sultan Qaboos University. His last post was at the University of Colorado at Boulder (1998–2001). Thereafter he retired to Tasmania.
