= Chris Freiling =

American mathematician

Christopher Francis Freiling is a mathematician responsible for Freiling's axiom of symmetry in set theory. He has also made significant contributions to coding theory, in the process establishing connections between that field and matroid theory.

Freiling obtained his Ph.D. in 1981 from the University of California, Los Angeles under the supervision of Donald A. Martin. He is a member of the faculty of the Department of Mathematics at California State University, San Bernardino.

== Selected publications ==
- Freiling, Chris (1986), "Axioms of symmetry: throwing darts at the real number line", The Journal of Symbolic Logic, 51 (1): 190–200, doi:10.2307/2273955, ISSN 0022-4812, JSTOR 2273955, MR 0830085, S2CID 38174418
- Dougherty, Randall; Freiling, Christopher; Zeger, Kenneth (2005), "Insufficiency of linear coding in network information flow", IEEE Transactions on Information Theory, 51 (8): 2745–2759, doi:10.1109/TIT.2005.851744, S2CID 2543400.
- Dougherty, Randall; Freiling, Chris; Zeger, Kenneth (2007), "Networks, matroids, and non-Shannon information inequalities", IEEE Transactions on Information Theory, 53 (6): 1949–1969, doi:10.1109/TIT.2007.896862, MR 2321860, S2CID 27096.
