= Edward Marczewski =

Polish mathematician (1907–1976)

- Edward Szpilrajn
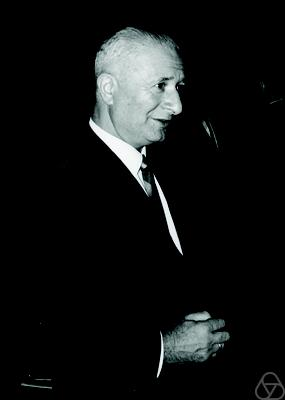
- Edward Marczewski in Lvov, 1967
- Born: 15 November 1907; Warsaw, Vistula Land, Russian Empire
- Died: 17 October 1976 (aged 68); Wrocław, Poland
- Citizenship: Russian, Polish
- Education: University of Warsaw
- Known for: Szpilrajn extension theorem Marczewski function
- Awards: Gold Cross of Merit (1950)
- Scientific career
- Fields: Mathematics
- Workplaces: University of Wrocław; Polish Academy of Sciences
- Thesis: (1932)
- Doctoral advisor: Wacław Sierpiński
- Doctoral students: Siemion Fajtlowicz; Stanisław Hartman; Maria Nosarzewska; Jerzy Płonka; Kazimierz Urbanik

Edward Marczewski (15 November 1907 – 17 October 1976) was a Polish mathematician. He was born Szpilrajn but changed his name while hiding from Nazi persecution.

Marczewski was a member of the Warsaw School of Mathematics. His life and work after the Second World War were connected with Wrocław, where he was among the creators of the Polish scientific centre. He worked at the State Institute of Mathematics, which was incorporated into the Polish Academy of Sciences in 1952.

Marczewski's main fields of interest were measure theory, descriptive set theory, general topology, probability theory and universal algebra. He also published papers on real and complex analysis, applied mathematics and mathematical logic.

Marczewski proved that the topological dimension, for arbitrary metrisable separable space X, coincides with the Hausdorff dimension under one of the metrics in X which induce the given topology of X (while otherwise the Hausdorff dimension is always greater or equal to the topological dimension). This is a fundamental theorem of fractal theory. (Certain contributions to this development were also made by Samuel Eilenberg, see: Witold Hurewicz and Henry Wallman, Dimension Theory, 1941, Chapter VII.) Hurewicz and Wallman explicitly acknowledge Samuel Eilenberg in the Preface for providing "stimulating advice in preparing the manuscript".
