= Axiom of finite choice =

Axiom in set theory

In mathematics, the axiom of finite choice is a weak version of the axiom of choice which asserts that if $(S_\alpha)_{\alpha \in A}$ is a family of non-empty finite sets, then

$\prod_{\alpha \in A} S_\alpha \neq \emptyset$ (set-theoretic product).

If every set can be linearly ordered, the axiom of finite choice follows.

== Applications ==
An important application is that when $(\Omega, 2^\Omega, \nu)$ is a measure space where $\nu$ is the counting measure and $f: \Omega \to \mathbb R$ is a function such that

$$\int_\Omega |f| d \nu < \infty$$,

then $f(\omega) \neq 0$ for at most countably many $\omega \in \Omega$.
