= Robert Nyce =

American politician

Robert E. Nyce

Member of the Pennsylvania House of Representatives from the 138th district
- In office January 1, 1991 – November 30, 1996
- Preceded by: Frank Yandrisevits
- Succeeded by: Craig Dally

Personal details
- Born: October 14, 1946 (age 79) Allentown, PA
- Party: Republican
- Spouse: Maria I. Datta
- Children: Jennifer Ann Nyce-Domchek
- Education: Northampton Area High School, Northampton, PA; Moravian College, Bethlehem, PA, BA Accounting
- Occupation: Accountant, Specializing in Corporate Taxes.

Robert E. Nyce (born October 14, 1946) is a former Republican member of the Pennsylvania House of Representatives.

== Formative years ==
Born in Allentown, Pennsylvania on October 14, 1946, Nyce graduated from Northampton Area Senior High School in Northampton.

Nyce served in the U.S. Army from 1966 to 1969. Having completed his basic training at Fort Knox, Kentucky and Advanced Individual Training at Fort Lewis, Washington he was assigned to the 1st Battalion, 3rd Infantry Unit, "The Old Guard" at Arlington National Cemetery where he served for roughly two-and-one-half years, attaining the rank of staff sergeant, E-6 before taking an early release to return to Moravian College in Bethlehem, Pennsylvania in September 1969. While serving at Arlington, Nyce participated in former President Dwight D. Eisenhower's funeral, President Nixon's Inauguration and Robert F. Kennedy's Funeral.

== Career ==
A tax professional for more than twenty years, Nyce worked at the Lehigh Portland Cement Company in Allentown from 1970 to 1973. A manager of credit taxes and insurance and payroll at the Frick Company in Waynesboro from 1973 to 1975, he then served as a senior tax accountant for the Bethlehem Steel Corporation from 1975 to 1985. He was then appointed as assistant vice president of taxes for Chrysler First, Inc. in Allentown, and served in that role from 1985 to 1990.

Nyce was a member of the Tax Executives Institute including Chairman of the State Tax Committee in the 1980s. During his private sector employment, he was active in his community of East Allen Township.

From 1979 to 1984, he served as a member and chairman of the East Allen Township Municipal Authority and again from 2007 to 2013 as a member and treasurer. From 2011 to 2013, he negotiated and helped close the sale of the East Allen Township Municipal Authority's assets to the city of Bethlehem and the Bath Borough Municipal Authority to ensure water and sewer service for all residents of East Allen Township.

From 1984 to 1990, Nyce served on the Northampton Area School District Board of Directors as member, vice chair and chair. He also served on the Bethlehem Area Vocational Technical School Joint Operating Committee as member, vice chair and Chair. In both capacities, he was responsible for normal business operations and participated in union contract negotiations with staff.

In 1990, he ran for and was elected to the Pennsylvania House of Representatives, representing the 138th district, which encompasses parts of Northampton and Monroe Counties. During his three terms, he served on several important committees: Education, Local Government, Fish and Game, Finance.

In 1996, he ran unsuccessfully for the state auditor general's seat. Following the campaign, he was hired as the executive director of the Pennsylvania Independent Regulatory Review Commission (IRRC); he served for eight years in that capacity, overseeing two major revisions to the Regulatory Review Act and many significant regulatory issues facing the residents of Pennsylvania. The PA IRRC reviews all regulations promulgated in the Commonwealth of Pennsylvania and provides citizens an opportunity to comment on and affect those regulations prior to their adoption by the state agencies authorizing those regulations. The two exceptions are Pennsylvania's Fish and Boat Commission and Game Commission, which remain outside the regulatory review process.

In 2005, Nyce retired from state government. He now resides in Northampton County. A member of the Free and Accepted Masons of Pennsylvania since 1971 and the Rajah Shrine in Reading since the mid-1990s, he is also a past member of the Northampton Exchange Club.

Party political offices
Preceded by Barbara Hafer	Republican nominee for Auditor General of Pennsylvania; 1996	Succeeded by Katie True
