= Pennsylvania House of Representatives, District 138 =

American legislative district

Pennsylvania's 138th State House of Representatives district
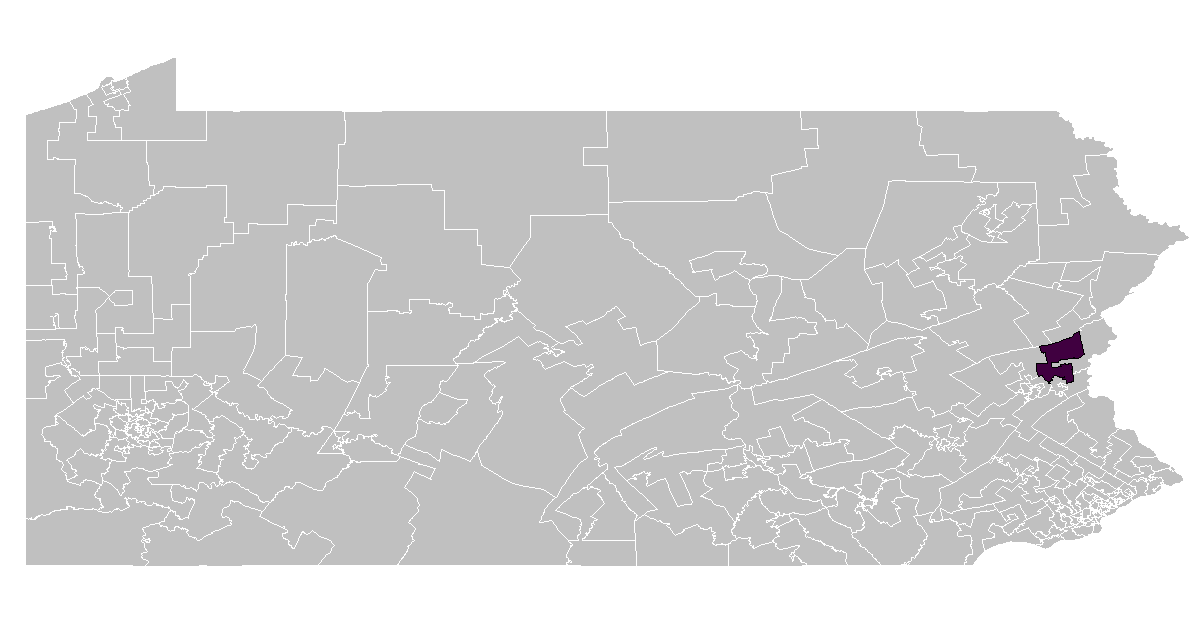
Representative
Ann Flood; R–Bath
- Demographics: 92.2% White; 2.2% Black; 4.1% Hispanic
- Population (2011) • Citizens of voting age: 64,326; 49,818

The 138th Pennsylvania House of Representatives District is located in Southeastern Pennsylvania and has been represented since 2021 by Ann Flood.

== District profile ==
The 138th District of the Pennsylvania House of Representatives is located in Northampton County. It includes the Graver Arboretum and is made up of the following areas:

- Bangor
- Bushkill Township
- Forks Township
- Chapman
- East Bangor
- Lower Mount Bethel Township
- Moore Township (Part, Districts Eastern and Pt. Phillips)
- Pen Argyl
- Plainfield Township
- Portland
- Roseto
- Stockertown
- Upper Mount Bethel Township
- Washington Township
- Wind Gap

== Representatives ==
Representative	Party	Years	District home	Notes
Before 1967, seats were apportioned by county.
Russell Kowalyshyn	Democrat	1969 – 1984		
Frank W. Yandrisevits	Democrat	1985 – 1990		Later represented 183rd legislative district
Robert E. Nyce	Republican	1991 – 1996		
Craig Dally	Republican	1997 – 2010	Bushkill Township	Resigned after being elected district judge
Marcia Hahn	Republican	2010 – 2020	Bath	Elected in special election on May 18
Ann Flood	Republican	2021 – Present		Incumbent

== Recent election results ==
PA House election, 2010: Pennsylvania House, District 138
Party	Candidate	Votes	%	±%
Republican	Marcia Hahn	22,112	100	
Margin of victory		22,112	100	
Turnout		22,112	100	

PA House election, 2012: Pennsylvania House, District 138
Party	Candidate	Votes	%	±%
Republican	Marcia Hahn	20,405	62.88	
Democratic	Leslie Altieri	12,046	37.12	
Margin of victory		8,359	25.76	▼74.24
Turnout		32,451	100	

PA House election, 2014: Pennsylvania House, District 138
Party	Candidate	Votes	%	±%
Republican	Marcia Hahn	12,898	66.32	
Democratic	Leslie Altieri	6,551	33.68	
Margin of victory		6,347	32.64	▲6.88
Turnout		19,449	100	

PA House election, 2016: Pennsylvania House, District 138
Party	Candidate	Votes	%	±%
Republican	Marcia Hahn	23,287	90.02	
Libertarian	Daniel Richardson	2,583	9.98	
Margin of victory		20,704	80.04	▲47.40
Turnout		25,870	100	
