= Maiale =

The word maiale (plural maiali) is:

- Italian for "pig"
- An Italian word for a manned torpedo
- Nicholas Maiale, a former Democratic member of the Pennsylvania House of Representatives and a native of Philadelphia
