= Pennsylvania House of Representatives, District 183 =

American legislative district

Pennsylvania's 183rd State House of Representatives district
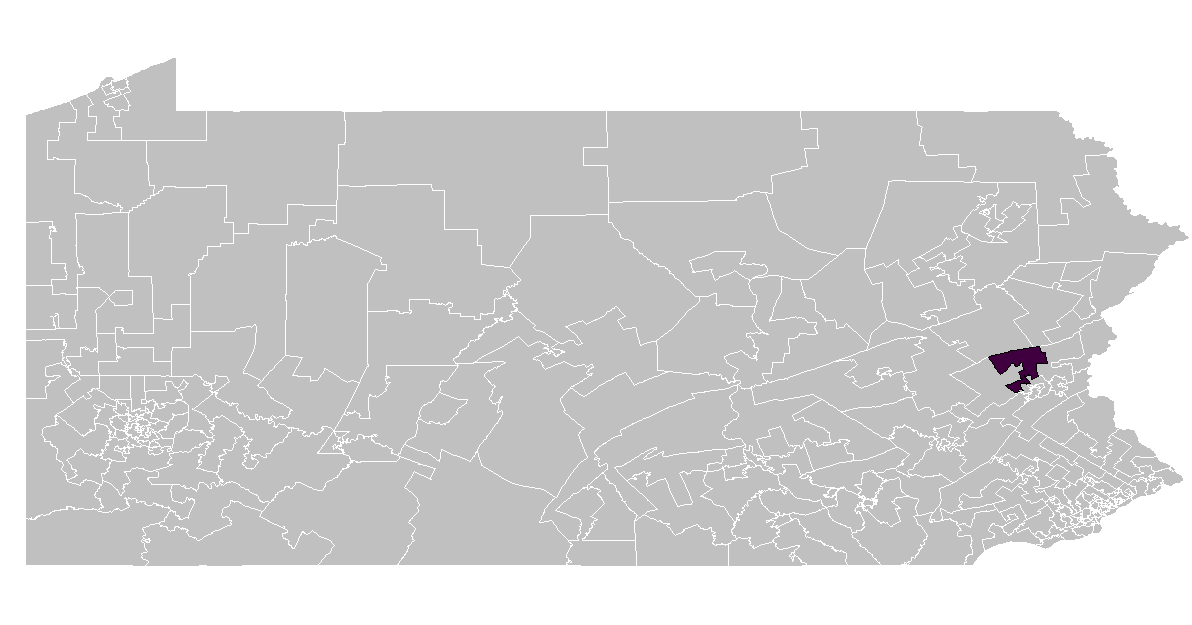
- Map of Pennsylvania House of Representatives District 183 in Pennsylvania
Representative
Zach Mako; R–Northampton
- Demographics: 94.2% White; 1.4% Black; 3.4% Hispanic
- Population (2011) • Citizens of voting age: 60,767; 48,165

The 183rd Pennsylvania House of Representatives District is located in eastern Pennsylvania and has been represented since 2017 by Zach Mako.

== District profile ==
The 183rd Pennsylvania House of Representatives District is located in Lehigh County and Northampton County and encompasses Mary Immaculate Missionary College and Indian Creek. It also includes the following areas:

- Lehigh County
  - Slatington
  - Lowhill Township
  - North Whitehall Township
- Northampton County
  - Bath
  - North Catasauqua
  - Northampton
  - Walnutport
  - Allen Township
  - East Allen Township
  - Lehigh Township
  - Moore Township (PART, Districts Beersville and Klecknersville)

== Representatives ==
Representative	Party	Years	District home	Note
Prior to 1969, seats were apportioned by county.
James J. Tayoun	Democrat	1969 – 1970		
Adriano Mastrangelo	Republican	1971 – 1972		
Matthew Cianciulli, Jr.	Democratic	1977 – 1980		Resigned November 14, 1979
Nicholas J. Maiale	Democratic	1979 – 1992		Elected March 1980 to fill vacancy
District moved from Philadelphia County to Lehigh & Northampton Counties after 1982
Frank W. Yandrisevits	Democratic	1993 – 1994		Previously represented 138th legislative district
Julie Harhart	Republican	1995 – 2016		
Zach Mako	Republican	2017 – present		Incumbent

== Recent election results ==
PA House election, 2010: Pennsylvania House, District 183
Party	Candidate	Votes	%	±%
Republican	Julie Harhart	14,226	80.74	
Green	Rex D'Agostino	3,393	19.26	
Margin of victory		10,833	61.48	
Turnout		17,619	100.0	

PA House election, 2012: Pennsylvania House, District 183
Party	Candidate	Votes	%	±%
Republican	Julie Harhart	21,221	100.0	
Margin of victory				
Turnout		21,221	100.0	

PA House election, 2014: Pennsylvania House, District 183
Party	Candidate	Votes	%	±%
Republican	Julie Harhart	10,261	60.94	
Democratic	Terri Powell	5,061	30.06	
Independent	Michael Molovinsky	1,515	9.0	
Margin of victory		5,200	30.88	
Turnout		16,837	100.0	

PA House election, 2016: Pennsylvania House, District 183
Party	Candidate	Votes	%	±%
Republican	Zach Mako	17,481	57.92	
Democratic	Phillips Armstrong	12,700	42.08	
Margin of victory		4,781	15.84	
Turnout		30,181	100	

PA House election, 2018: Pennsylvania House, District 183
Party	Candidate	Votes	%	±%
Republican	Zach Mako	14,020	56.64	
Democratic	Jason Ruff	10,731	43.36	
Margin of victory		3,289	13.28	
Turnout		24,751	100	

PA House election, 2020: Pennsylvania House, District 183
Party	Candidate	Votes	%	±%
Republican	Zach Mako	22,294	61.03	
Democratic	Jason Ruff	14,233	38.97	
Margin of victory		8,061	22.06	
Turnout		36,527	100	
