= Matt Christopher =

American writer

- Born: Matthew Frederick Christopher; August 16, 1917; Bath, Pennsylvania, U.S.
- Died: September 20, 1997 (aged 80); Charlotte, North Carolina, U.S.
- Occupation: Author
- Spouse: Catherine M. Krupa (m. 1940)
- Children: 4
- Writing career
- Years active: 1941–1996
- Genre: Children's literature
- Subject: Sports
- Website: mattchristopher.com

Matthew Frederick Christopher (August 16, 1917 – September 20, 1997) was an American writer of children's books. He wrote more than 100 novels and 300 short stories, mainly featuring sports. After Christopher's death, his family oversaw production of books under Christopher's name created by various writers and illustrators, treating his name as a trademark.

== Early life and education ==
Matthew Christopher was born in Bath, Pennsylvania and was the oldest of nine children. He was a gifted athlete as a child, excelling in nearly every sport he attempted, especially baseball and football, which he played in high school when the family moved to Ludlowville, New York.

After graduating from high school in 1935, Christopher maintained his involvement in baseball, playing first in a semi-professional league in the mid-1930s before moving up to professional ball, playing third base for the Smith Falls Beavers of Ontario, Canada (an affiliate of the Class C Can-Am League). Despite having two hits and two RBIs in four at-bats in his first game, Christopher soon found that he could not hit minor-league pitching consistently and was cut from the team. Although he was offered a spot on the Brockport Blues in the same league, he declined their offer. Christopher returned home to New York, where he played semi-professional baseball until a knee injury ended his career.

Christopher married Catherine M. Krupa (Cay) on July 13, 1940, and had four children together. Two works by Christopher were published in 1941, a one-act play and a detective story, for which he earned $5 and $50. He then worked full-time for National Cash Register in Ithaca, New York, and he retained a full-time job until he was financially able to retire and write full-time in 1963.

== Career ==
Christopher recalled at age 77 he won a prize in a short-story writing contest at 17. Of 200 winners, he ranked 191st. He wrote "a detective story a week for 40 weeks," among other activities at about age 20.

"I became interested in writing when I was 14, a freshman in high school," Christopher reflected in 1992.

"I was selling magazines such as the Saturday Evening Post, Country Gentleman, and Liberty, and I would read the stories, particularly the adventure and mystery stories, and think how wonderful it would be to be able to write stories and make a living at it. I also read detective, horror, aviation, and sports stories and decided I would try writing them myself. Determined to sell, I wrote a detective story a week for 40 weeks, finding the time to marry, work, and play baseball and basketball before I sold my first story in 1941, 'The Missing Finger Points', for $50 to Detective Story magazine." —published by Fiction House.

For the next 20 years, Christopher wrote novels in several genres including science fiction, mystery, adventure, and romance, but he was unable to get a single one published, even as his short stories continued to sell.

In 1953, he finally sold his first book, Look for the Body, a 60,000-word detective novel, to Phoenix Press of New York City for $150 ($1,665 in 2022 dollars).

But his true success came in 1954 with the publication of The Lucky Baseball Bat. "I decided to write a baseball book for children", said Christopher. "I was living in Syracuse, New York at the time, working at General Electric. I spoke about my idea to the branch librarian. She was immediately interested and told me that they needed sports stories badly." His conversation with the librarian, along with a rejection letter from a publisher (who recommended that Christopher concentrate on writing stories for kids since he seemed to "have a talent for writing about children"), inspired Christopher to sit down over Thanksgiving in 1952 and write The Lucky Baseball Bat, whose publication by Little, Brown, and Company earned him $250 net. Thanks to that success he continued writing and his second children's sports novel, Baseball Pals, was published in 1956. Both those first two books were about 120 pages long and were published by Little, Brown with illustrations by Robert Henneberger.

By 1963, Matt had 15 novels published, most of them by Little, Brown. He was finally able to retire and concentrate solely on writing.

When asked why he wrote sports books for children, Christopher once responded, "Sports have made it possible for me to meet many new people with all sorts of life stories, on and off the field, and these are grist for this writer's mill."

In 1993, he won the annual Milner Award as "the author whose books are most liked by the children of Atlanta, Georgia".

== Death and legacy ==
Christopher died September 20, 1997, in Charlotte, North Carolina from surgical complications for a non-malignant brain tumor.

Christopher's son Dale later wrote a biography of his father "in the tradition of the Matt Christopher Biography Bookshelf, with exclusive photos, original letters, and memorabilia."
