= Marcia Hahn =

American politician from Pennsylvania

Marcia M. Hahn

Member of the Pennsylvania House of Representatives from the 138th district
- In office May 18, 2010 – January 5, 2020
- Preceded by: Craig Dally
- Succeeded by: Ann Flood

Personal details
- Party: Republican
- Children: 2
- Occupation: Political aide

Marcia M. Hahn is a politician from the U.S. state of Pennsylvania. A member of the Republican Party, she represented the 138th district in the Pennsylvania House of Representatives from 2010 to 2020.

== Biography ==
Hahn started her first term in the Pennsylvania House of Representatives in 2010, when she replaced her former boss Craig Dally in a special election following his resignation. She defeated Community College student Corey D. Miller and Republican lawyer Nick Sabatine for the seat. In 2012, Hahn ran for reelection in an unopposed primary, then beat Democratic candidate Leslie Alteri, winning approximately 60% of the vote. She then won again against Alteri in 2014 with approximately 66% of the vote. In 2016, Hahn ran and defeated Libertarian candidate Daniel Richardson for her fourth term as the State House of Representatives for District 138.

Hahn sat on four committees for the 2016-2017 sessions: Agriculture and Rural Affairs, Commerce, Health and Tourism, and Recreational Development. She also served as the deputy House majority whip.

Hahn's most recent term has focused on opioid addiction in Pennsylvania; she has held local meetings with community members to discuss the problem. She authored House Bill 2359, which proposed giving parents of a minor child suspected of drug or alcohol abuse a voice in their treatment.

Prior to her appointment to the Pennsylvania House of Representatives, Hahn worked as a legislative aid, constituent outreach coordinator and office manager to Len Gruppo of the 137th district and Craig Dally of the 138th district. She also served on the board of directors for the Nazareth Chamber of Commerce and the Pen Argyl Families First, which provides resources and programs to families in the Pen Argyl school district.
