= 1996 Pennsylvania Auditor General election =

- November 5, 1996
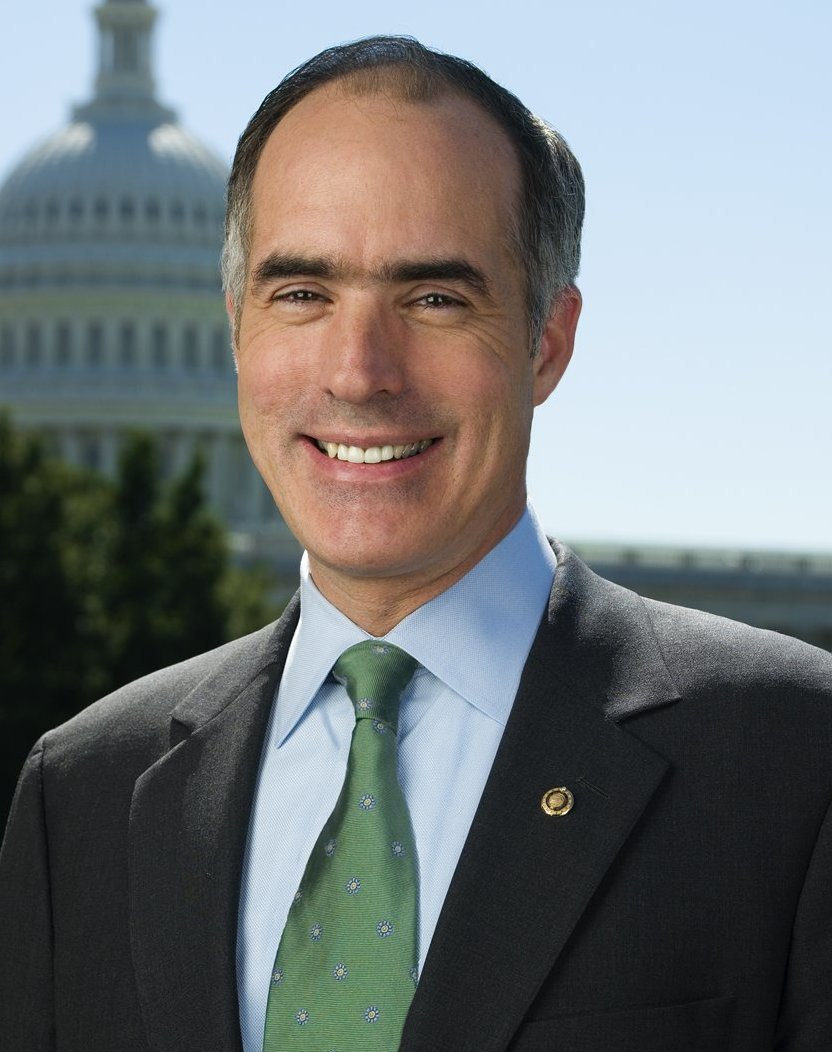

Nominee	Bob Casey Jr.	Robert Nyce
Party	Democratic	Republican
Popular vote	2,367,760	1,706,835
Percentage	56.09%	40.43%
- Casey: 40–50% 50–60% 60–70% 70–80% 80–90% >90% Nyce: 40–50% 50–60% 60–70%
Auditor General before election
Barbara Hafer
Republican
Elected Auditor General
Bob Casey Jr.
Democratic

The 1996 Pennsylvania Auditor General election was held on November 5, 1996, in order to elect the Auditor General of Pennsylvania. Bob Casey Jr., Democratic nominee and son of former Pennsylvania Governor Bob Casey Sr., defeated Republican nominee Robert Nyce, Libertarian nominee Sharon Shepps, and Constitution nominee Robert Lord.

== Democratic primary ==
=== Candidates ===
- Bob Casey Jr., lawyer and son of former Governor Bob Casey Sr.
- Tom Foley, former Pennsylvania Secretary of Labor and Industry
- Sandra A. Miller
- William R. Lloyd Jr., member of the Pennsylvania House of Representatives

=== Results ===
Primary results by county Casey: 30%–40%; 40%–50%; 50%–60%; 60%–70%; Foley: 30%–40%; 40%–50%; 50%–60%; Lloyd: 30%–40%; 80%–90%; Miller: 30%–40%; 50%–60%

Democratic primary results
Party	Candidate	Votes	%
Democratic	Bob Casey Jr.	252,645	34.65
Democratic	Tom Foley	242,190	33.21
Democratic	William R. Lloyd Jr.	128,500	17.62
Democratic	Sandra A. Miller	105,868	14.52
Total votes		729,203	100.00

== Republican primary ==
Robert Nyce, member of the Pennsylvania House of Representatives, ran unopposed in the primary.

=== Results ===
Republican primary results
Party	Candidate	Votes	%
Republican	Robert Nyce	480,199	100.00
Total votes		480,199	100.00

== General election ==
On election day, Democratic nominee Bob Casey Jr. won the election by a margin of 660,925 votes against his foremost opponent, Republican nominee Robert Nyce, thereby gaining control of the office for the Democrats.

=== Results ===
Pennsylvania Auditor General election, 1996
Party	Candidate	Votes	%
Democratic	Bob Casey Jr.	2,367,760	56.09
Republican	Robert Nyce	1,706,835	40.43
Libertarian	Sharon H. Shepps	103,234	2.45
Constitution	Robert P. Lord	43,487	1.03
Total votes		4,221,316	100.00
Democratic gain from Republican			
