= Zach Mako =

American politician

Member of the Pennsylvania House of Representatives from the 183rd district
- Incumbent
- Assumed office January 3, 2017
- Preceded by: Julie Harhart

Personal details
- Born: December 17, 1988 (age 37) Walnutport, Pennsylvania, U.S.
- Party: Republican
- Education: Kutztown University of Pennsylvania B.A. Pennsylvania State University M.B.A.

Zachary Mako (born December 17, 1988) is an American politician who has served in the Pennsylvania House of Representatives from the 183rd district since 2017.

== Early life and education ==
Mako was born on December 17, 1988, and was raised in Walnutport and graduated from the Northampton Area High School. Mako is also a veteran of the Pennsylvania National Guard and was deployed to Afghanistan during Operation Enduring Freedom. During his time in the army Mako earned an bachelor's degree in finance from Kutztown University of Pennsylvania in 2015. Later in 2023 he earned a master of business administration from Pennsylvania State University.

== Political career ==
=== Pennsylvania House of Representatives ===
==== 2016 ====
Following the retirement of Julie Harhart, Mako was one of two Republicans to attempt to succeed her in the 2016 Pennsylvania House of Representatives election, running a close race with Cynthia Miller, supervisor of Lehigh Township. Mako would win the primary with 3,614 votes to Miller's 3,418. Mako would go on to defeat Democrat Phillips Armstrong, a Whitehall Township commissioner with 17,481 votes to Armstrong's 12,700. After less than two months serving in the House Mako was called to Fort Rucker for air combat operations training as he is still an active member of the army reserve, as a Chinook pilot.

==== 2018 ====
During the 2018 Pennsylvania House of Representatives election, Mako faced off against Democrat Jason Ruff, a small business owner from Slatington, Pennsylvania and vice president of their borough council. Ruff would center his campaign on Mako's refusal to support anti-gerrymandering efforts, while Mako would largely ignore Ruff's campaign, refusing to attend a debate hosted by the League of Women voters. Ruff would lose with just 10,731 votes to Mako's 14,020.

==== 2020 ====
Mako and Ruff rematched in the 2020 Pennsylvania House of Representatives election. Mako centered his campaign on lifting COVID-19 restrictions, while Ruff supported further shutdowns. Mako also expressed opposition to introducing vote by mail saying it could "potentially allow for fraud" while Ruff supported the practice saying it would "ensure a fair election." Both Mako and Ruff supported reforms to property tax to reduce the burden on the district's elderly. Mako would beat Ruff by a wider margin, earning 22,294 votes to Ruff's 14,233.

==== 2022 ====
Mako ran unopposed in the 2022 Pennsylvania House of Representatives election. At that time, Mako introduced an amendment to a Pennsylvania law outlawing the use of ATVs and dirt bikes within city limits so that the vehicles can be used in boroughs and townships. Mako also secured $150,000 for the refurbishment of the Slatington municipal pool, which had been closed since 2020 due to the COVID-19 pandemic and had fallen into disrepair.

==== 2024 ====
Mako faced his first primary challenge in the 2024 Pennsylvania House of Representatives election, running against Zachari Halkias, the president pro tem of the Slatington Borough Council and a member of the Lehigh County Republican Committee. Halkias accused Mako of not being a "true conservative", for not being more supportive of Donald Trump, and for being out of touch with his constituency's residents, especially those in Slatington. Halkias specifically targeted Mako's support of a bill which would protect non-Pennsylvania residents traveling to Pennsylvania to get an abortion. Mako would soundly defeat Halkias, 5,216 votes to 1,997 votes, to go on to the general election where he faced off against Democrat Joseph Lenzi, a 62-year-old truck parts salesman. Lenzi acknowledged that he was running a losing campaign just before the election, with Mako defeating him with a 20,999-10,977 vote lead.

== Election results ==
PA House election, 2024: Pennsylvania House, District 183
Party	Candidate	Votes	%	±%
Republican	Zach Mako	20,999	65.67	▼34.33
Democratic	Joseph Lenzi	10,977	34.33	▲34.33
Margin of victory		8,061	31.34	▼68.66
Turnout		31,976	100	

PA House primary, 2024: Pennsylvania House, District 183
Party	Candidate	Votes	%	±%
Republican	Zach Mako	5,216	72.31	▲20.91
Republican	Zachari Halkias	1,997	27.69	▼20.91
Margin of victory		3,219	44.62	▲28.78
Turnout		7,213	100	▲181

PA House election, 2022: Pennsylvania House, District 183
Party	Candidate	Votes	%	±%
Republican	Zach Mako	21,730	100	▲38.97
Margin of victory		21,730	100	▲77.94
Turnout		21,730	100	

PA House election, 2020: Pennsylvania House, District 183
Party	Candidate	Votes	%	±%
Republican	Zach Mako	22,294	61.03	▲4.39
Democratic	Jason Ruff	14,233	38.97	▼4.39
Margin of victory		8,061	22.06	▲8.78
Turnout		36,527	100	

PA House election, 2018: Pennsylvania House, District 183
Party	Candidate	Votes	%	±%
Republican	Zach Mako	14,020	56.64	▲1.28
Democratic	Jason Ruff	10,731	43.36	▼1.28
Margin of victory		3,289	13.28	▼2.56
Turnout		24,751	100	

PA House election, 2016: Pennsylvania House, District 183
Party	Candidate	Votes	%	±%
Republican	Zach Mako	17,481	57.92	Steady
Democratic	Phillips Armstrong	12,700	42.08	Steady
Margin of victory		4,781	15.84	Steady
Turnout		30,181	100	Steady

PA House primary, 2016: Pennsylvania House, District 183
Party	Candidate	Votes	%	±%
Republican	Zach Mako	3,614	51.4	Steady
Republican	Cynthia Miller	3,418	48.6	Steady
Margin of victory		196	2.8	Steady
Turnout		7,032	100	Steady
