= Adriano Mastrangelo =

American politician

Member of the Pennsylvania House of Representatives from the 183rd district
- In office January 5, 1971 – November 30, 1972
- Preceded by: James Tayoun
- Succeeded by: Matthew Cianciulli, Jr.

Personal details
- Born: February 8, 1919 Bomba, Abruzzo, Italy
- Died: April 9, 1999 (aged 80) Philadelphia, Pennsylvania
- Party: Republican
- Spouse: Rita Vannoni (April 2, 1938–)

Adriano Henry Mastrangelo (February 8, 1919 – April 9, 1999) is a former Republican member of the Pennsylvania House of Representatives.
