= Russell Kowalyshyn =

American politician

Member of the Pennsylvania House of Representatives from the 138th district
- In office January 7, 1969 – November 30, 1984
- Preceded by: District Created
- Succeeded by: Frank Yandrisevits

Member of the Pennsylvania House of Representatives from the Northampton County district
- In office January 5, 1965 – November 30, 1968

Personal details
- Born: September 16, 1918 Northampton, Pennsylvania
- Died: April 17, 1988 (aged 69) Northampton, Pennsylvania
- Party: Democratic

Russell Kowalyshyn (September 16, 1918 – April 17, 1988) was a Democratic member of the Pennsylvania House of Representatives.
