= Frank Yandrisevits =

American politician (1954–2024)

Frank W. Yandrisevits

Member of the Pennsylvania House of Representatives from the 183rd district
- In office January 5, 1993 – November 30, 1994
- Preceded by: Nicholas Maiale
- Succeeded by: Julie Harhart

Member of the Pennsylvania House of Representatives from the 138th district
- In office January 1, 1985 – November 30, 1990
- Preceded by: Russell Kowalyshyn
- Succeeded by: Robert Nyce

Personal details
- Born: September 12, 1954 Northampton, Pennsylvania, U.S.
- Died: May 20, 2024 (aged 69) Northampton, Pennsylvania, U.S.
- Party: Democratic

Frank W. Yandrisevits (September 12, 1954 – May 20, 2024) was an American lawyer and politician who was a Democratic member of the Pennsylvania House of Representatives from 1985 to 1990, and again from 1993 to 1994. Yandrisevits died in Northampton, Pennsylvania, on May 20, 2024, at the age of 69.
