= Daniel Steckel House =

Historic house in Pennsylvania, United States

- U.S. National Register of Historic Places
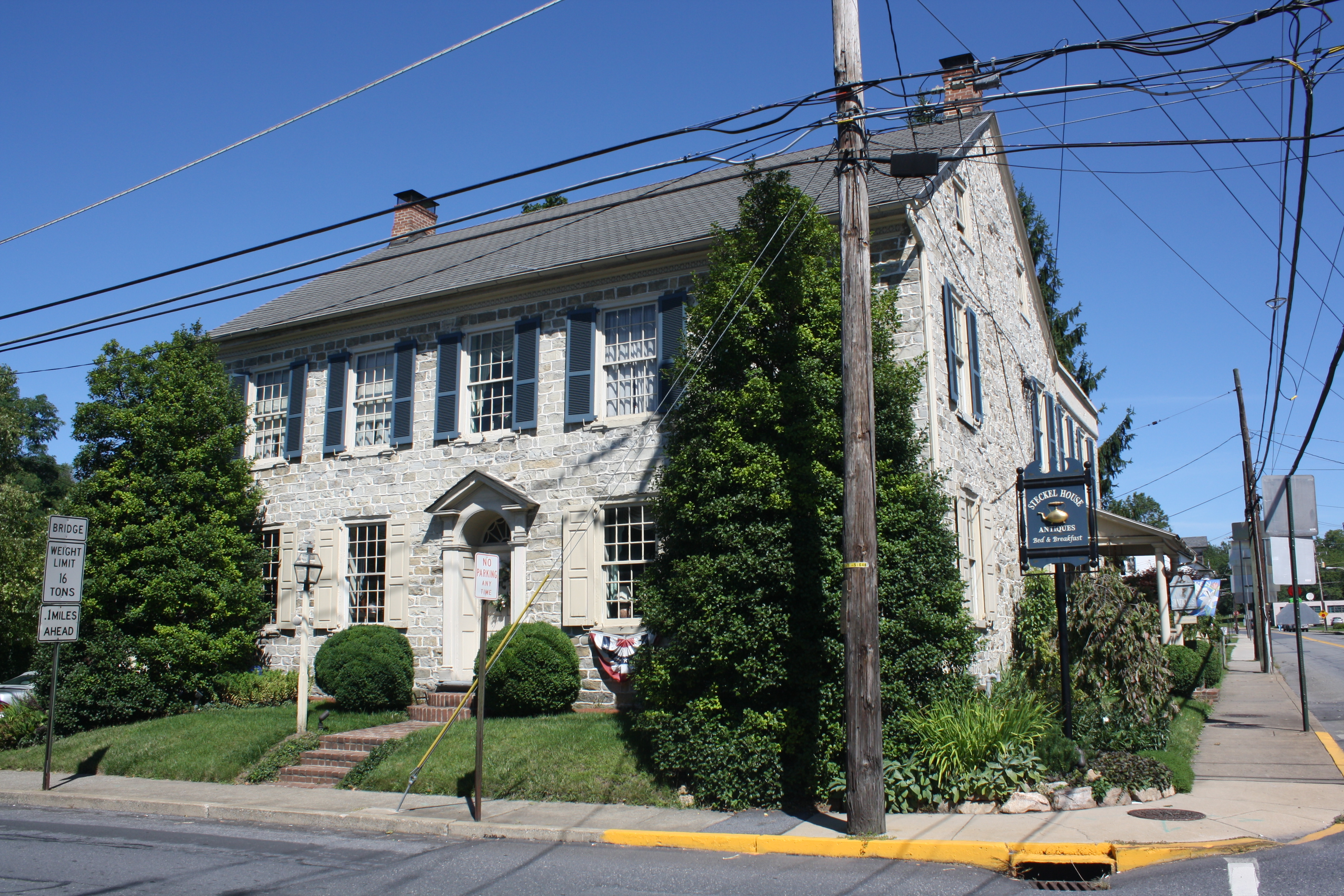
- Daniel Steckel House. August 2013.

- Location within Pennsylvania Location within the United States
- Location: 207 W. Northampton St., Bath, Pennsylvania
- Coordinates: 40°43′38″N 75°23′40″W
- Area: 0.3 acres (0.12 ha)
- Built: 1803
- Architectural style: Federal
- NRHP reference No.: 82003802
- Added to NRHP: March 8, 1982

Daniel Steckel House is a historic home located at Bath, Northampton County, Pennsylvania. It was built in 1803, and is a 2 1/2-story Federal style limestone dwelling. It has an early 19th-century brick addition housing a bake oven, and a frame addition built between 1885 and 1918. It features two end-wall brick chimneys, and more than 85 percent of the interior fabric remains intact. It was built as a showplace for the developing settlement of Bath. The house is open as a bed and breakfast.

It was added to the National Register of Historic Places in 1982.
