= Matthew Cianciulli =

American politician

Matthew Cianciulli, Jr.

Member of the Pennsylvania House of Representatives from the 183rd district
- In office 1977 – November 14, 1979
- Preceded by: Adriano Mastrangelo
- Succeeded by: Nicholas J. Maiale

Personal details
- Born: July 28, 1942 Philadelphia, Pennsylvania, U.S.
- Died: November 15, 2008 (aged 66) Hammonton, New Jersey, U.S.
- Party: Democratic

Matthew J. Cianciulli, Jr. (July 28, 1942 – November 15, 2008) was an American politician who served as a Democratic member of the Pennsylvania House of Representatives.
