= 2004 Pennsylvania State Treasurer election =

- November 2, 2004
- Turnout: 5,473,824 votes
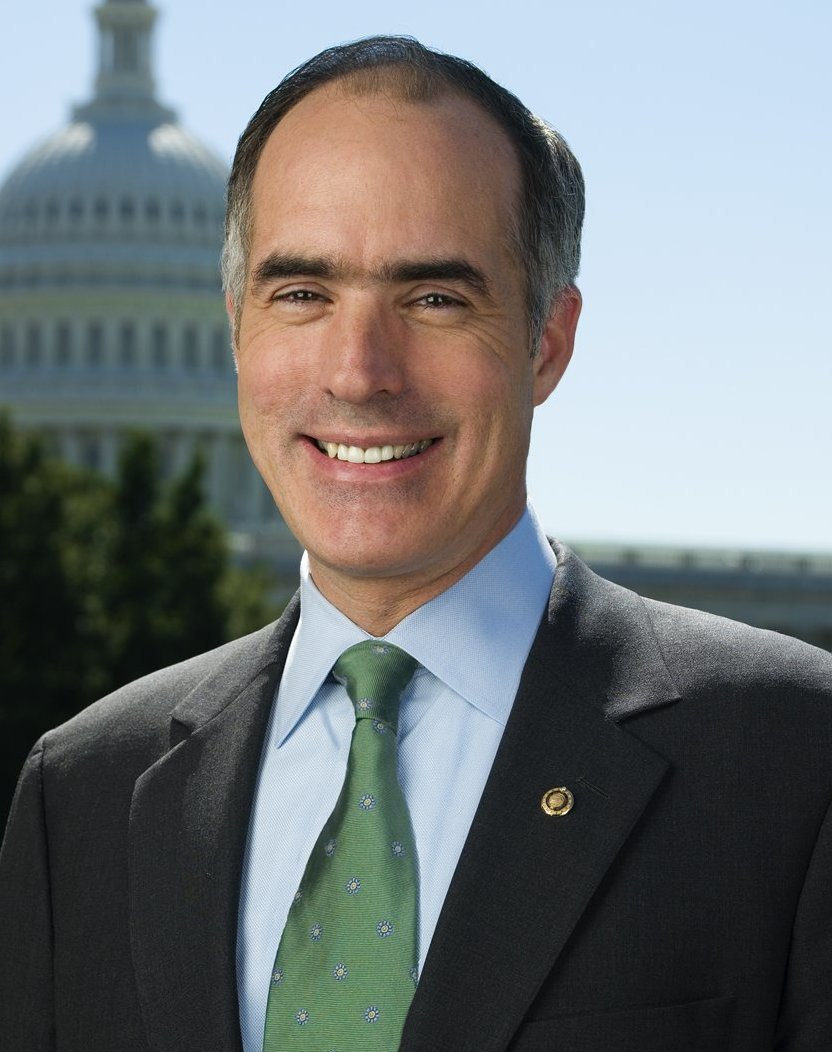

Nominee	Bob Casey Jr.	Jean Craige Pepper
Party	Democratic	Republican
Popular vote	3,353,489	1,997,951
Percentage	61.26%	36.50%
- Casey: 40–50% 50–60% 60–70% 70–80% 80–90% >90% Pepper: 40–50% 50–60% 60–70% 70–80% 80–90% >90% Tie: 40–50% 50% No votes
Treasurer before election
Barbara Hafer
Democratic
Elected Treasurer
Bob Casey, Jr.
Democratic

The Pennsylvania State Treasurer election was held on November 2, 2004. Incumbent state treasurer Barbara Hafer switched her party affiliation from Republican to Democratic in 2003. Hafer was term limited and could not run for a third consecutive term in office. Necessary primary elections took place on April 27, 2004. Bob Casey Jr. who was term-limited in his position as Auditor General, successfully earned the Democratic nomination for Treasurer, running unopposed in the primary. He won the general election by a comfortable margin. The Republicans had difficulty recruiting a top-tier candidate, and Jean Craige Pepper, an Erie financial executive, was the only Republican who filed.

== General election ==
2004 Pennsylvania State Treasurer election
Party	Candidate	Votes	%
Democratic	Bob Casey Jr.	3,353,489	61.3
Republican	Jean Craige Pepper	1,997,951	36.5
Libertarian	Darryl Perry	61,238	1.1
Green	Paul Teese	40,740	0.7
Constitution	Max Lampenfield	20,406	0.4
Total votes		5,473,824	100.0
Democratic hold		Swing	
