= Craig Dally =

American politician

Member of the Pennsylvania House of Representatives from the 138th district
- In office January 7, 1997 – January 4, 2010
- Preceded by: Robert Nyce
- Succeeded by: Marcia Hahn

Personal details
- Born: 1956 (age 69–70)
- Party: Republican
- Education: Lafayette College, Villanova University School of Law
- Occupation: Attorney

Craig Dally was a Republican member of the Pennsylvania House of Representatives for the 138th District. Dally was first elected in 1996 and was in office until 2010. Dally resigned on January 4 after being elected a judge for the 3rd District of the Northampton County Court of Common Pleas.

== Career ==
Dally is a practicing attorney and member of the Pennsylvania, New Jersey, and Northampton County Bar Associations. He is admitted to practice before all the courts of Pennsylvania, the United States District Court for the Eastern District of Pennsylvania and the United States Supreme Court.

== Personal ==
Dally graduated from Pen Argyl Area High School. He received his Bachelor of Arts Degree in Economics and Business from Lafayette College and earned his law degree from Villanova University School of Law.

Dally served on the board of directors of the Nazareth YMCA, including a stint as president from 1995 to 1996. He is a former director of the Big Brothers and Big Sisters of the Lehigh Valley and is also on the board of the Two Rivers Health and Wellness Foundation and the board of Moravian Hall Square Retirement Community. Additionally, he was a former councilman for the Borough of Pen Argyl.

Dally and his wife reside in Bushkill Township, Northampton County. They have two daughters.
