= Ann Flood (politician) =

American politician

Member of the Pennsylvania House of Representatives from the 138th district
- Incumbent
- Assumed office January 5, 2021
- Preceded by: Marcia Hahn

Personal details
- Born: 1974 (age 51–52) Bethlehem, Pennsylvania, U.S.
- Party: Republican
- Education: Moravian College (BS)
- Website: Official website

Ann Flood (born 1974) is an American politician. She is a Republican member of the Pennsylvania House of Representatives. She had represented the 138th district in Northampton County since 2021.

== Biography ==
Flood graduated from Pen Argyl Area High School and received a Bachelor of Science degree in biology from Moravian College.

In 2020, Flood was elected to the Pennsylvania House of Representatives representing the 138th district, which is part of Northampton County. She defeated Democratic candidate Tara Zrinski with 56.2% of the vote in the general election.
