= Bob Casey Jr. =

American lawyer and politician (born 1960)

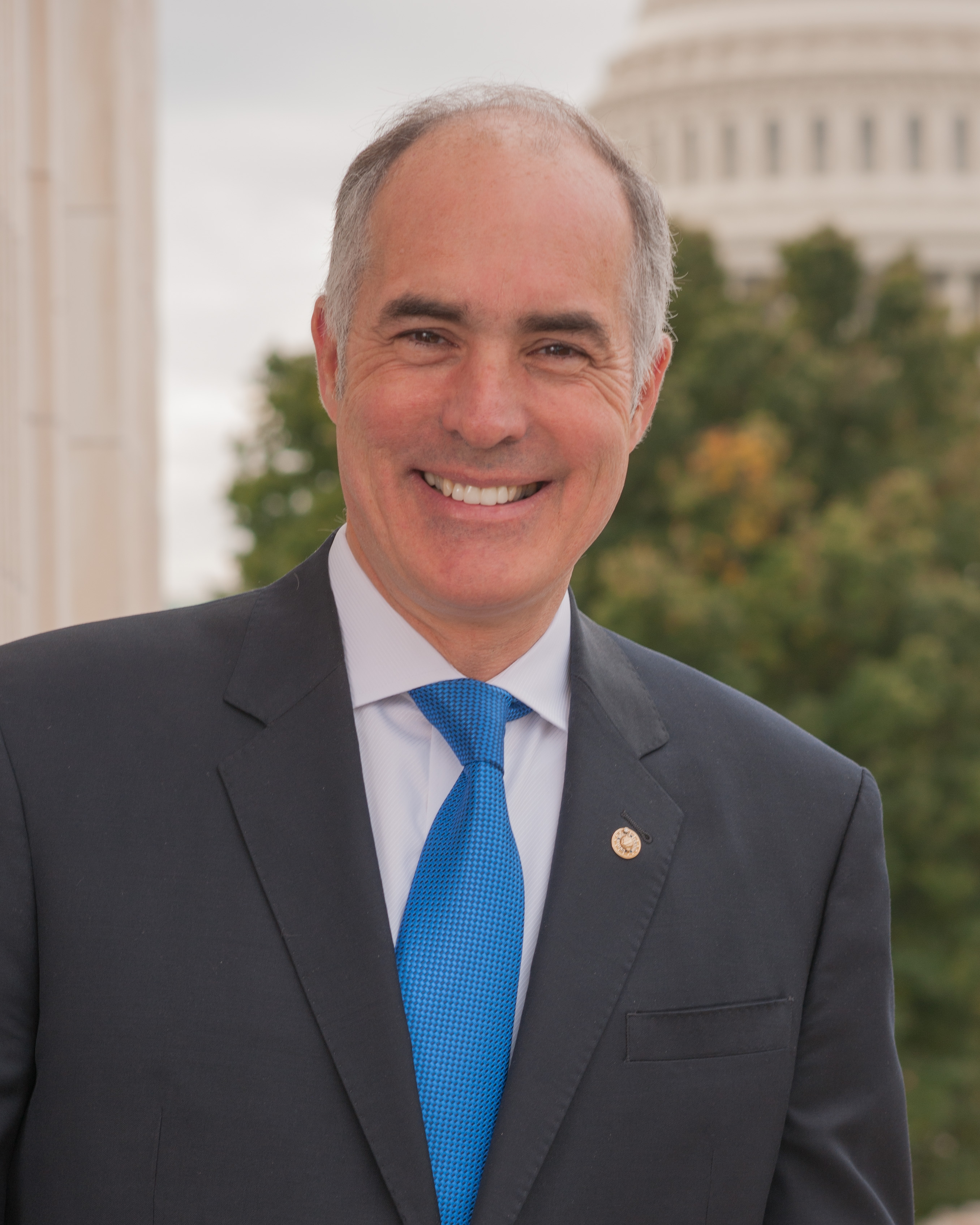
- Official portrait, 2016

United States Senator from Pennsylvania
- In office January 3, 2007 – January 3, 2025
- Preceded by: Rick Santorum
- Succeeded by: Dave McCormick
Committee positions
Chair of the Senate Aging Committee
In office February 3, 2021 – January 3, 2025
Preceded by	Susan Collins
Succeeded by	Rick Scott
Ranking Member of the Senate Aging Committee
In office January 3, 2017 – February 3, 2021
Preceded by	Claire McCaskill
Succeeded by	Tim Scott

74th Treasurer of Pennsylvania
- In office January 18, 2005 – January 3, 2007
- Governor: Ed Rendell
- Preceded by: Barbara Hafer
- Succeeded by: Robin Wiessmann

47th Auditor General of Pennsylvania
- In office January 21, 1997 – January 18, 2005
- Governor: Tom Ridge; Mark Schweiker; Ed Rendell
- Preceded by: Barbara Hafer
- Succeeded by: Jack Wagner

Personal details
- Born: Robert Patrick Casey Jr. April 13, 1960 (age 66) Scranton, Pennsylvania, U.S.
- Party: Democratic
- Spouse: Terese Foppiano (m. 1985)
- Children: 4
- Parent: Bob Casey Sr. (father)
- Education: College of the Holy Cross (BA); Catholic University of America (JD)
- Website: Official website
- Casey's voice Casey supporting the Pregnant Workers Fairness Act. Recorded December 8, 2022

Robert Patrick Casey Jr. (born April 13, 1960) is an American lawyer and politician who served from 2007 to 2025 as a United States senator from Pennsylvania. He is a member of the Democratic Party.

Born in Scranton, Pennsylvania, Casey is the son of Bob Casey Sr., a former governor of Pennsylvania. After graduating from the College of the Holy Cross and the Catholic University of America, he practiced law in Scranton before beginning his political career as Pennsylvania Auditor General, a position he was elected to in 1996 and held until 2005.

In 2002, Casey ran for governor of Pennsylvania, but lost the Democratic primary to Ed Rendell. After being term-limited out of his position as auditor general, Casey was elected treasurer in 2004. In 2006, Casey ran for the U.S. Senate and defeated the Republican incumbent, Rick Santorum. Casey was reelected in 2012 and in 2018. In 2024, he narrowly lost reelection to Republican nominee David McCormick by a 0.22% margin.

== Early life and education ==
Robert Patrick Casey Jr. was born in Scranton, Pennsylvania, on April 13, 1960, one of eight children of Ellen (née Harding) and Bob Casey Sr., the 42nd governor of Pennsylvania. He is of Irish descent.

Casey played basketball at Scranton Preparatory School, from which he graduated in 1978. He graduated from the College of the Holy Cross in Worcester, Massachusetts, with a Bachelor of Arts in 1982, then earned a Juris Doctor from the Columbus School of Law at The Catholic University of America in Washington, D.C., in 1988. Between college and law school, Casey served as a member of the Jesuit Volunteer Corps and spent a year teaching 5th grade and coaching basketball at the Gesu School in Francisville, Philadelphia. He practiced law in Scranton from 1988 until 1996.

== Early political career ==
=== State auditor ===
Casey ran for Pennsylvania State Auditor General in 1996, winning the Democratic nomination. He won the general election and was reelected in 2000, serving two terms, from 1997 to 2005.

In a 2002 PoliticsPA feature story designating politicians with yearbook superlatives, Casey was named "Most Likely to Succeed".

=== 2002 gubernatorial election ===
Casey attempted to follow in his father's footsteps by running for governor of Pennsylvania. He faced former Philadelphia Mayor Ed Rendell in the Democratic primary election. Rendell had run for governor and lost to Casey's father in 1986. The Pennsylvania Democratic Party supported Casey, whom it saw as more electable than Rendell due to his popularity among Democrats statewide, strong support from unions, and name recognition. He chose Jack Wagner as his running mate.

In a bitter primary, classified as the then-most expensive in Pennsylvania's history, Rendell won the nomination by winning only 10 out of 67 counties: Philadelphia and its suburbs (Bucks, Chester, Montgomery, and Delaware), its Lehigh Valley exurbs (Berks, Lehigh, and Northampton), Lancaster, and Centre, the home of Penn State University. Casey endorsed Rendell after the primary and Rendell won the general election.

=== State treasurer ===
In 2004, Casey, who was term limited as auditor general, was elected State Treasurer. He served in this position from 2005 to 2007.

== U.S. Senate (2007–2025) ==
=== Elections ===
==== 2006 ====
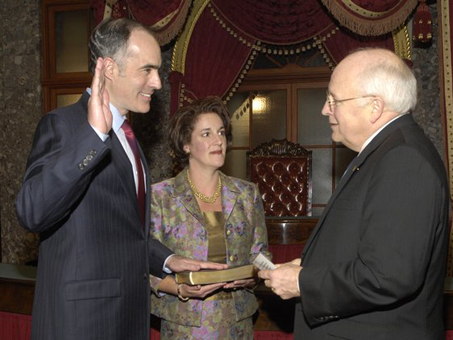
Casey being sworn into the Senate by Vice President Dick Cheney in January 2007

In 2005, Casey received calls from U.S. Senators Chuck Schumer, the chair of the Democratic Senatorial Campaign Committee, and Harry Reid, the Senate minority leader. Both asked him to run for U.S. Senate in the 2006 U.S. Senate election against Republican incumbent Rick Santorum. On March 5, 2005, Casey launched his campaign for the Democratic nomination. His run for the Senate was his fifth statewide campaign in nine years.

Casey was almost immediately endorsed by Governor Ed Rendell, his primary election opponent from 2002. He was endorsed by two Democrats who had been mentioned as possible U.S. Senate nominees: former Congressman Joe Hoeffel, who had run against Pennsylvania's other Senator, Arlen Specter, in 2004, and former State Treasurer Barbara Hafer, whom many in the abortion rights movement had attempted to convince to run against Casey in the Democratic primary.

Casey's more socially conservative views led to two challenges in the Democratic primary. His two challengers, college professor Chuck Pennacchio and pension lawyer Alan Sandals, argued that Casey's views on abortion and other social issues were too conservative for most Pennsylvania Democrats. Casey challenged this, arguing his opinions gave him cross-party appeal. He defeated both challengers in the May 16 primary with 85% of the vote.

On election night, Casey won the race with 59% of the vote to Santorum's 41%. Casey's 17.4-point victory margin was the highest ever for a Democrat running for Senate in Pennsylvania. It was also the largest for a challenger to any incumbent Senator since James Abdnor unseated George McGovern by 18.8 points in 1980.

==== 2012 ====
Results of the 2012 United States Senate election in Pennsylvania by county

Casey sought reelection in 2012. His prospects were uncertain. Observers noted that as the election approached, Casey, an early supporter of Obama, had "started to oppose the president outright or developed more nuanced responses to events that differentiate him from Mr. Obama. Analysts say Mr. Casey wants to put some distance between himself and a president whose job approval ratings in Pennsylvania are poor". In December 2011, it was reported that the AFL–CIO would spend "over $170,000" on pro-Casey TV ads.

Casey easily defeated challenger Joseph Vodvarka in the Democratic primary, and faced the Republican nominee, former coal company owner Tom Smith, in the general election. He defeated Smith on November 6, 53.7% to 44.6%, making him the first Democrat elected to a second term in the Senate from Pennsylvania since Joseph S. Clark Jr. in 1962.

==== 2018 ====
Casey defeated the Republican nominee, U.S. Congressman and former Hazelton mayor Lou Barletta, 55.7% to 42.6%. The victory made Casey the first Democrat to be elected to a third term in state history, as well as the first to win six statewide elections.

==== 2024 ====
Casey ran for a fourth Senate term in 2024 and lost to Republican nominee David McCormick by 0.22%, in the closest Senate race of the 2024 cycle. In an interview after the election, Casey attributed his defeat to not winning enough votes in the Philadelphia metropolitan area, while losing ground in the state's rural areas.

=== Tenure ===
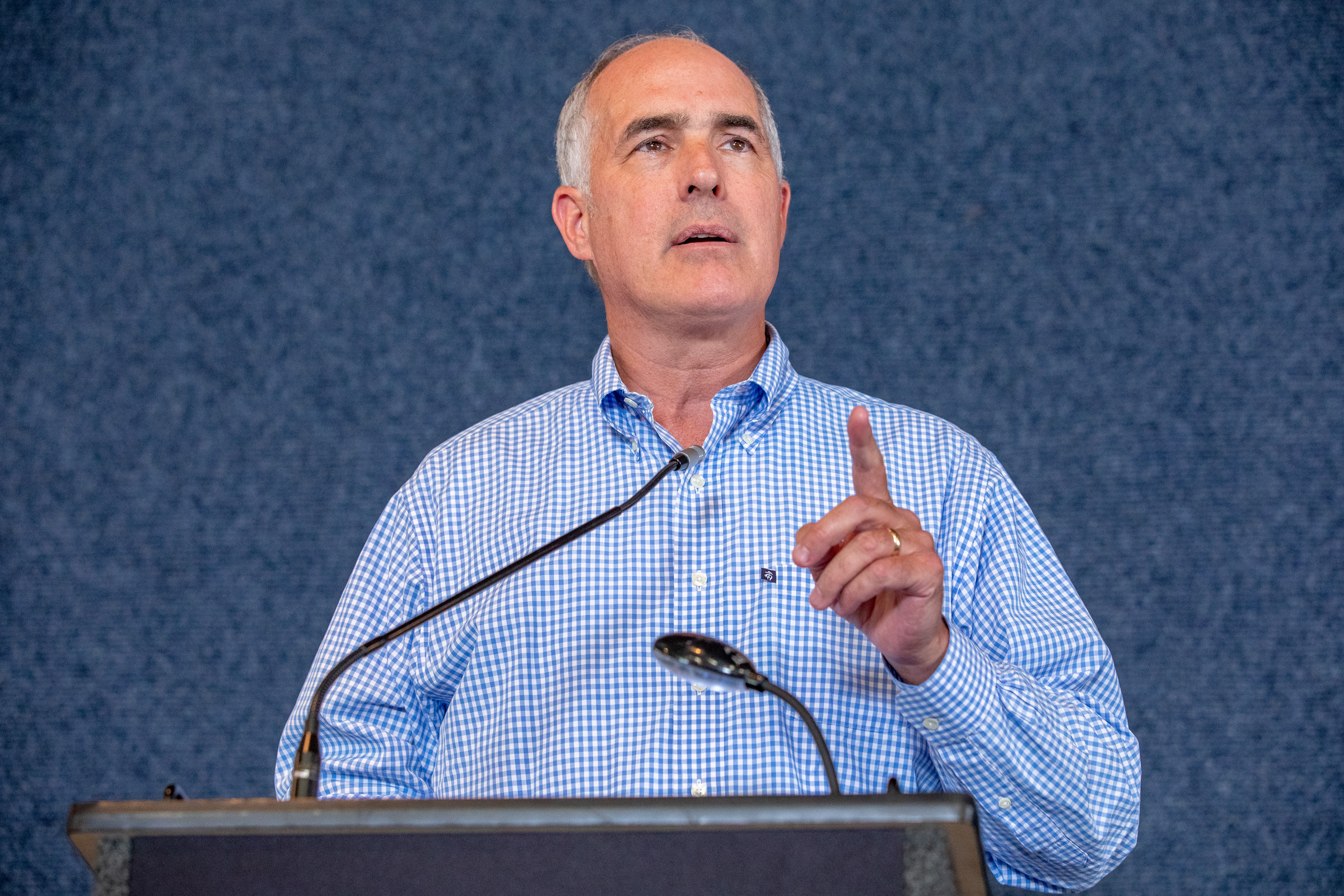
Casey speaks at the 2019 Agriculture Progress Days

Casey endorsed Barack Obama in the Democratic presidential primaries of 2008. The Pennsylvania Report said he "struck gold" by endorsing Obama early in the primary, a move that gave him "inside access to the halls of the White House". Casey campaigned across Pennsylvania in support of Obama's candidacy in the months leading up to the primary in that state; they bowled together at Pleasant Valley Lanes in Altoona.

Casey has been called an "even-keeled moderate, not only in tone but in policy", but after Donald Trump became president in 2017, Casey developed a "new, saltier social media prowess". His outspoken opposition to many of Trump's actions prompted one local media outlet to describe his new strategy before his 2018 reelection campaign as "Oppose Trump every chance he gets".

In February 2018, while speaking to John Catsimatidis on New York radio station WNYM, Casey issued a warning to special counsel Robert Mueller not to deliver a report on his findings in the Russian interference in the 2016 United States elections investigation too near to the 2018 midterm elections. While saying he could not "make any assumptions about where the Mueller investigation is going", he said he "would recommend Mueller not release a report on his findings near the midterms" because it would "distract from elections or cause people to question the election's integrity".

=== Committee assignments ===
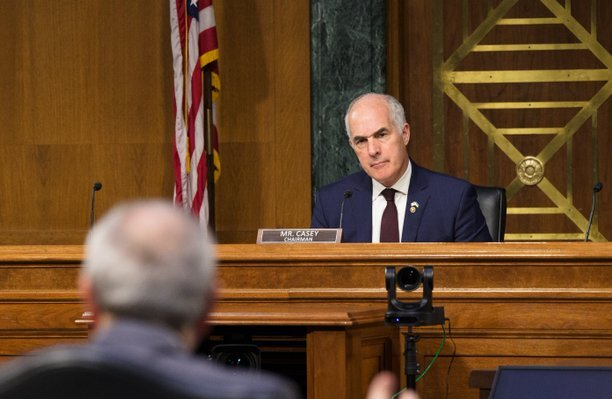
Casey chairing the Senate Committee on Aging

- Committee on Finance
  - Subcommittee on Health Care
  - Subcommittee on International Trade, Customs, and Global Competitiveness
  - Subcommittee on Social Security, Pensions, and Family Policy
- Committee on Health, Education, Labor, and Pensions
  - Subcommittee on Children and Families (Chairman)
  - Subcommittee on Employment and Workplace Safety
- Select Committee on Intelligence
- Special Committee on Aging (Chairman)

=== Caucus memberships ===
- Afterschool Caucuses

== Political positions ==
=== Economic issues ===
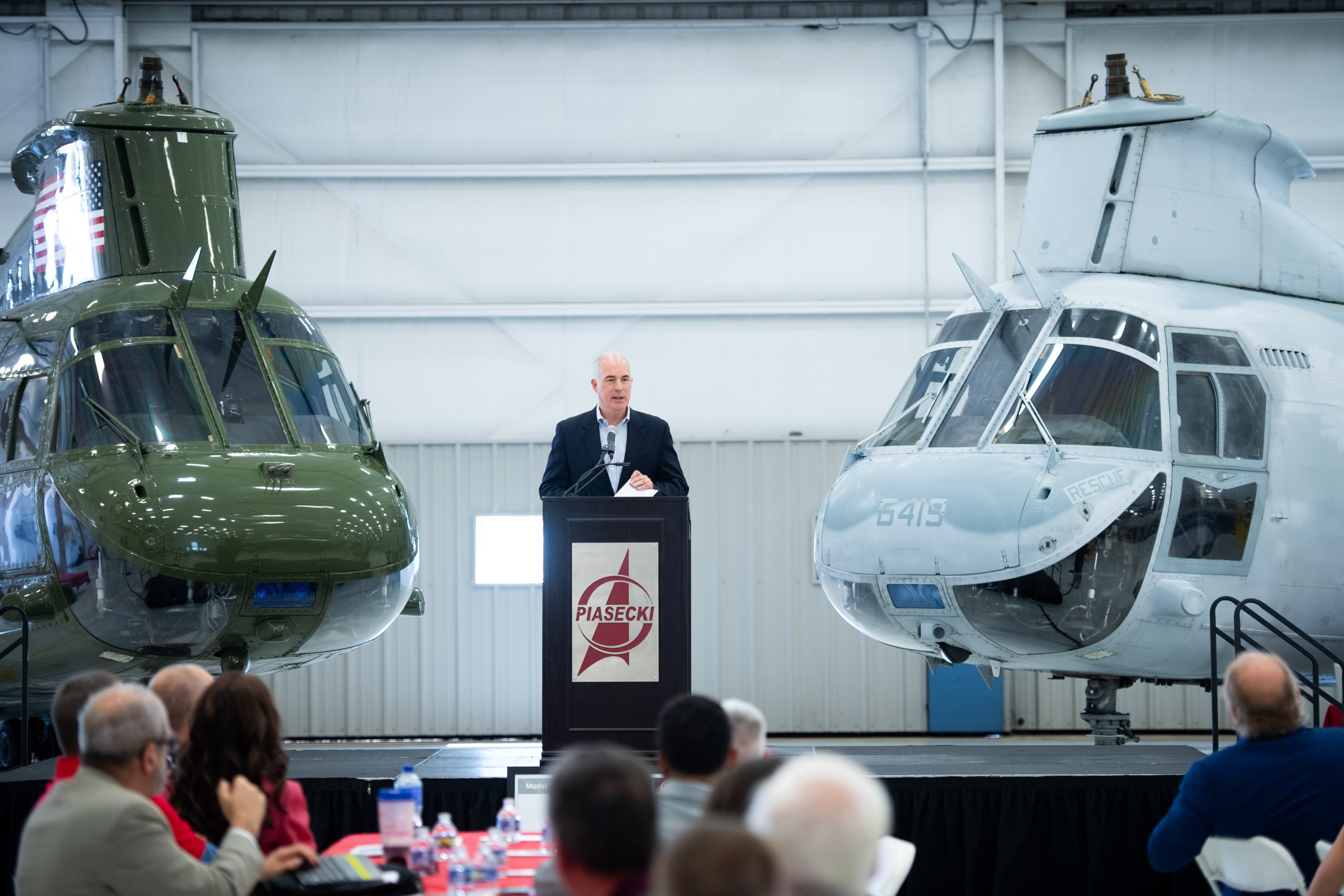
Casey at the Piasecki factory highlighting manufacturing jobs that his work has helped create in Pennsylvania

In 2014, Casey released a report on income inequality in Pennsylvania and urged Congress to raise the minimum wage, extend unemployment insurance, and increase funding for early education. He has said he believes that the United States has not exhausted its options to stop foreign countries from flooding the country with steel supplies, and that he wanted the Trump administration to defend nuclear power in Pennsylvania.

In 2017, Casey was one of eight Democratic senators to sign a letter to President Trump noting government-subsidized Chinese steel had been placed into the American market in recent years below cost and had hurt the domestic steel industry and the iron ore industry that fed it, calling on Trump to raise the steel issue with President of China Xi Jinping in his meeting with him.

In 2023, Casey introduced two bills focused on workplace AI and worker surveillance, including the No Robot Bosses Act, which prohibits employers from solely using an automated decision system to make employment-related decisions.

In 2024, Casey introduced the Shrinkflation Protection Act, which would prevent companies from selling smaller sizes of product without lowering prices, and the Price Gouging Prevention Act, which would create a federal ban on "grossly excessive price increases".

=== Education ===
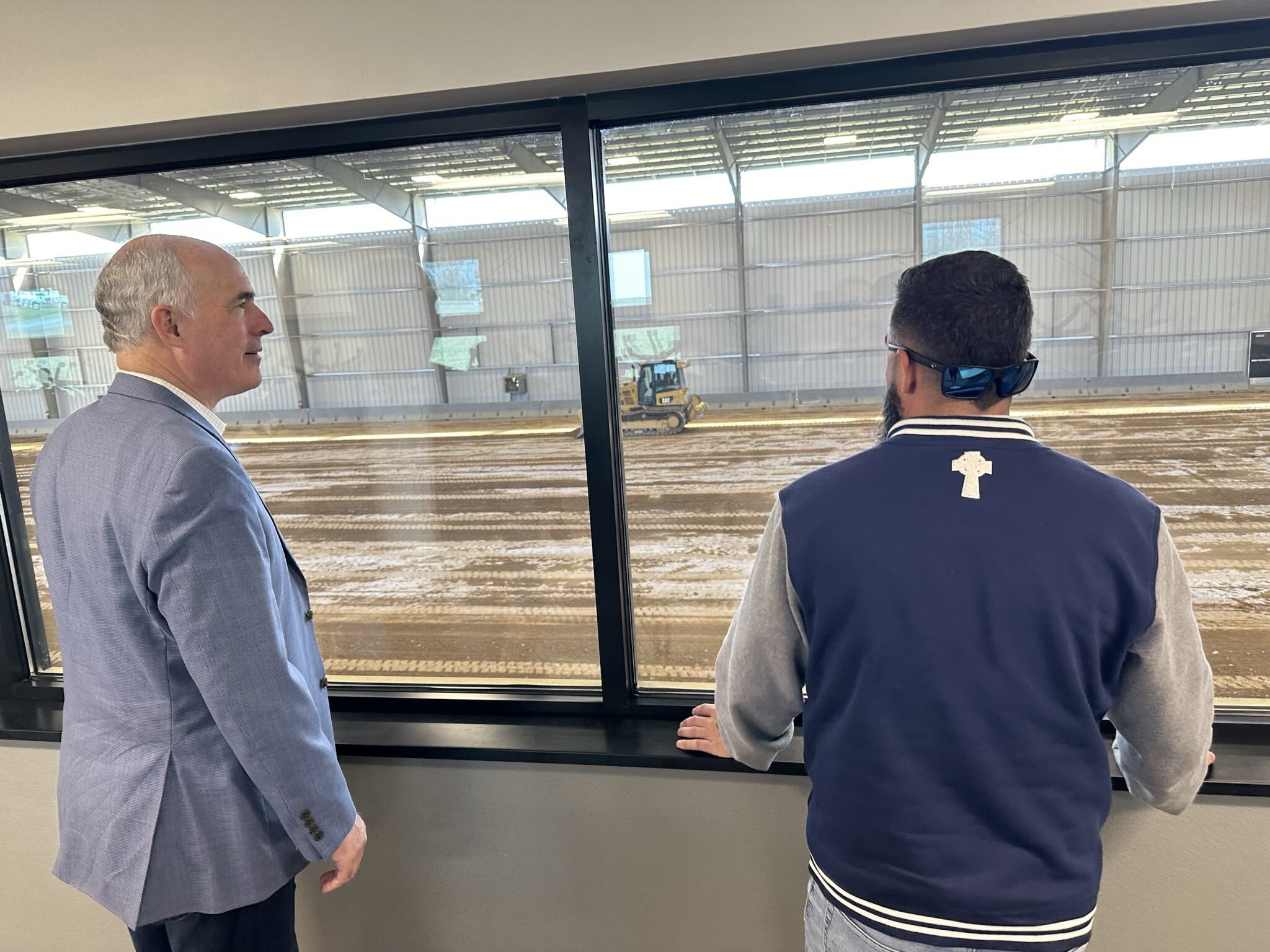
Casey at the new Operating Engineers Local 542 training facility in Bernville

As a candidate for state treasurer in 2004, Casey opposed school vouchers and supported using state funds "to increase the availability of safe, quality and affordable early care and education for families that choose to use these programs".

Casey questioned Trump's nomination of Betsy DeVos for Secretary of Education on the grounds that she and her husband had donated to the Foundation for Individual Rights in Education (FIRE), which seeks to "defend individual rights on college campuses". He asked DeVos to "fully explain whether she supports the radical view that it should be more difficult for campus sexual-assault victims to receive justice". In an op-ed in The Wall Street Journal, FIRE co-founder Harvey Silverglate wrote that "FIRE vigorously defends the free-speech and due-process rights of college students and faculty" and that the organization "is nonpartisan and has defended students and faculty members on the left and right", making "common cause with politically diverse organizations ranging from the American Civil Liberties Union and the National Association of Criminal Defense Lawyers to The Heritage Foundation, Young Americans for Liberty and the Cato Institute". Casey's position was challenged in USA Today by Stuart Taylor and KC Johnson, who wrote that, contrary to a letter in which Casey and Senator Patty Murray described campus sexual assault as "affecting millions of college students", 5,178 campus rapes were reported in 2014. Politico ran a prominent piece that echoed Casey's characterization of FIRE, while National Review and other publications assailed Casey and defended FIRE.

=== Energy and environment ===
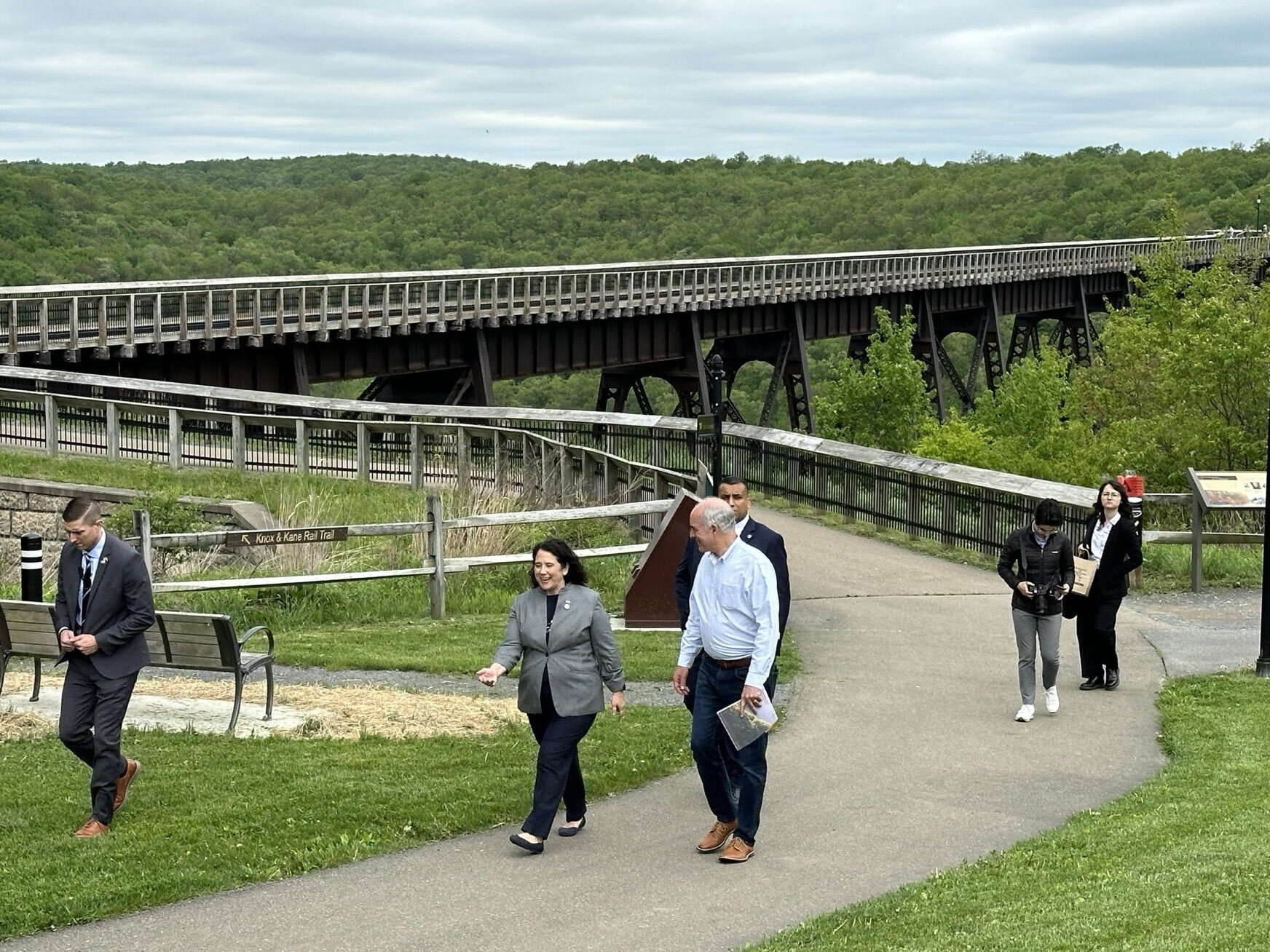
Casey visits the Kinzua Bridge State Park which he helped preserve from noise disruption from a potential low flying zone

Casey accused his Republican opponent Rick Santorum of not recognizing the danger of global warming.

=== Foreign policy ===
Along with over 70 other senators, Casey wrote to urge the European Union to designate Hezbollah as a terrorist organization. He introduced the Stop Terrorist Operational Resources and Money (STORM) Act of 2016, which punishes countries that accept terrorist financing by their citizens or within their borders. Casey voted for the Protect and Preserve International Cultural Property Act, which was designed to ensure that the U.S. is not a market for antiquities looted from Syria and was signed into law by Obama.

Casey condemned the genocide of the Rohingya Muslim minority in Myanmar and called for a stronger response to it.

Casey was one of 34 senators to sign a letter in 2019 to President Trump encouraging him "to listen to members of your own Administration and reverse a decision that will damage our national security and aggravate conditions inside Central America", asserting that Trump had "consistently expressed a flawed understanding of U.S. foreign assistance" since becoming president and that he was "personally undermining efforts to promote U.S. national security and economic prosperity" by preventing the use of Fiscal Year 2018 national security funding. The senators argued that foreign assistance to Central American countries created less migration to the U.S. by helping to improve conditions in those countries.

Casey voted against a resolution in 2024 proposed by Senator Bernie Sanders to apply the human rights provisions of the Foreign Assistance Act to U.S. aid to Israel's military. The proposal was defeated, 72 to 11.

=== Government spending and taxes ===
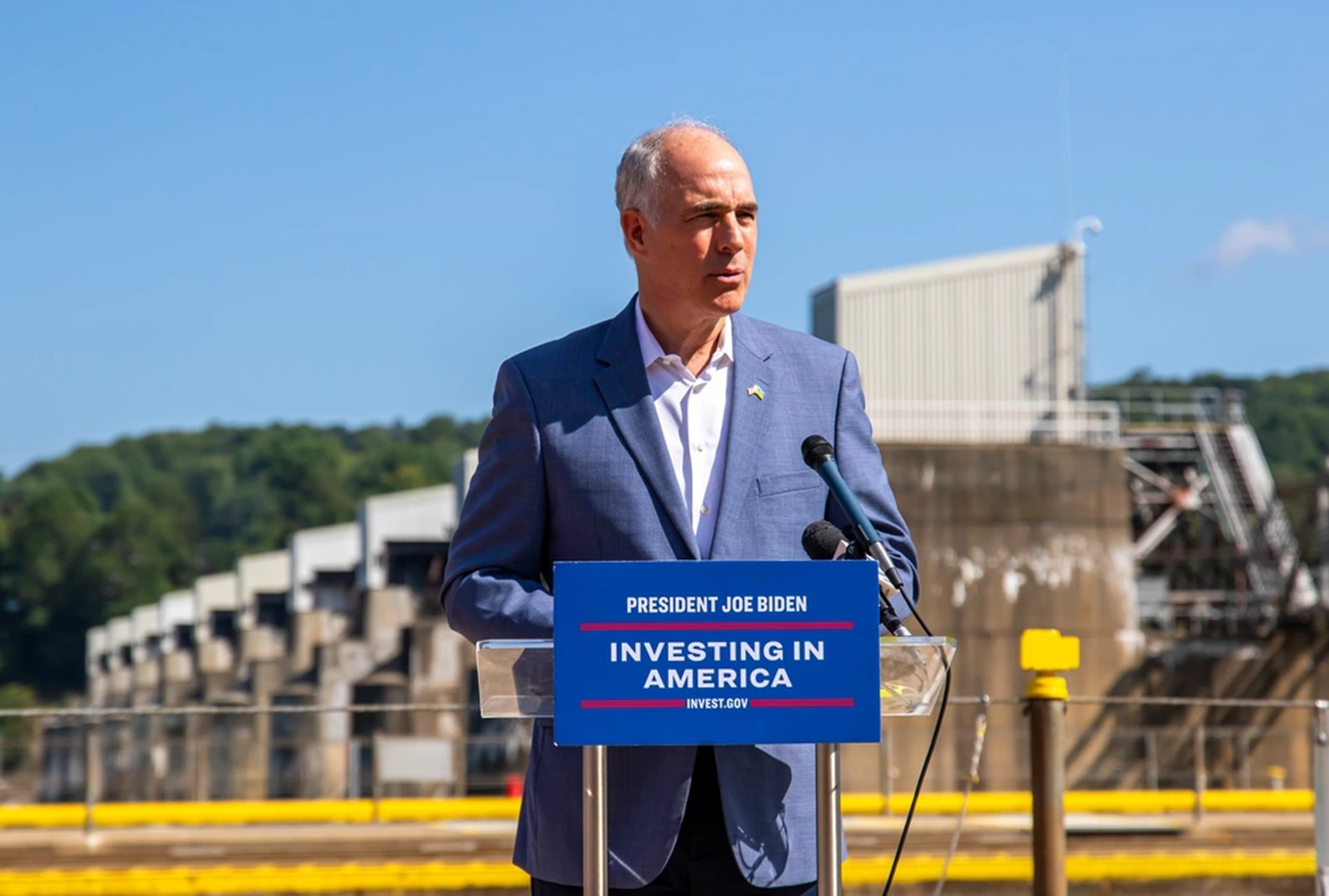
Casey highlights the success of the Infrastructure Investment and Jobs Act of 2021

Casey introduced legislation in 2012 that would extend the payroll tax cut for another year and provide tax credits for employers that add jobs.

In 2016, Casey joined a group of Senate Democrats led by Joe Manchin of West Virginia who wanted to extend expiring benefits for retired coal workers. Described as "unusually animated", Casey said he would "vote against a must-pass spending bill needed to keep the government running" if the coal miners' benefits were not extended.

Alongside all other Senate Democrats, Casey voted against the 2017 Tax Cuts and Jobs Act, saying that it was "a giveaway to the super rich".

=== Gun policy ===
Casey discusses gun safety policy in 2022

In 2016, The Washington Post reported that "'pro-gun' Bob Casey" had become "an evangelist for gun control laws". After the Sandy Hook school massacre in 2012, he had "completely flipped his views" on several gun issues, largely as a result of having been "accosted" by his wife and daughter. "Casey has since embraced every major proposal to counter gun violence", the Post reported, "including a renewed ban on assault weapons and enhanced background checks before gun purchases." In the wake of the Orlando Pulse massacre, he unveiled the Hate Crimes Prevention Act, which would have prevented people convicted of hate crimes from buying guns. He said he had never really thought about the gun issue until Sandy Hook, "coasting along with Pennsylvania's traditional pro-gun views in a state where the National Rifle Association has held sway for decades". After Sandy Hook, he "found it unacceptable that the NRA opposed any new laws".

Philadelphia magazine ran an article the same year about Casey's "profound about-face on gun control", noting that it had taken place in "a matter of days" and that Casey "was the first to introduce gun control legislation after the massacre in Orlando". Casey said his switch had been a result of "thinking of the enormity of it, what happened to those children, which was indescribably horrific, and then having my wife and daughter say to me, 'You're going to vote on this at some point. How are you going to vote?'" He said: "I had to ask myself that question, because normally I would stay in my lane. There's only two lanes on this. It's the NRA lane or the voting for commonsense gun measures lane. So I decided whether I was going to stay in the old lane, in which I had traveled a long time but really had never been challenged or had to cast a real big vote."

=== Healthcare ===
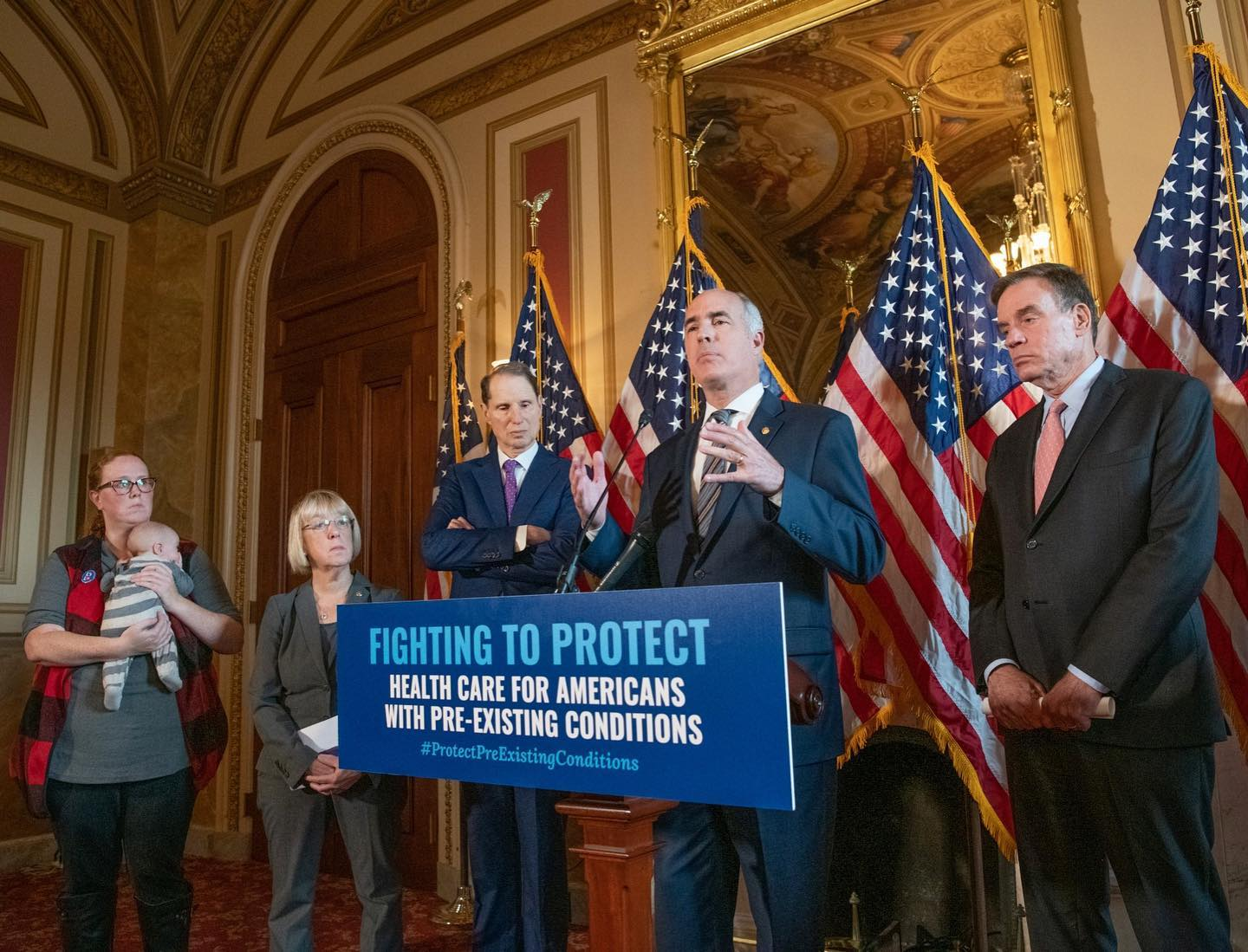
Casey pushes to preserve the Affordable Care Act which the Trump administration is attempting to repeal, 2019

Casey supported President Obama's health reform legislation; he voted for the Patient Protection and Affordable Care Act in 2009, and for the Health Care and Education Reconciliation Act of 2010.

Casey was one of six Democratic senators to introduce the American Miners Act of 2019, a bill that would amend the Surface Mining Control and Reclamation Act of 1977 to swap funds in excess of the amounts needed to meet existing obligations under the Abandoned Mine Land fund to the 1974 Pension Plan as part of an effort to prevent its insolvency as a result of coal company bankruptcies and the 2008 financial crisis. It also increased the Black Lung Disability Trust Fund tax and ensured that miners affected by the 2018 coal company bankruptcies would not lose their health care.

In 2019, when asked during a town hall whether he supported Medicare for All, Casey declined to directly answer, but said he supported "universal coverage".

Amid discussions to prevent a government shutdown in September 2019, Casey was one of six Democratic senators to sign a letter to congressional leadership advocating the passage of legislation that would permanently fund health care and pension benefits for retired coal miners as "families in Virginia, West Virginia, Wyoming, Alabama, Colorado, North Dakota and New Mexico" would start to receive notifications of health care termination by the end of the following month.

==== Abortion ====
Casey formerly identified as pro-life and expressed support for overturning Roe v. Wade. In 2005, he opposed funding embryonic stem cell research. In 2006, he supported the Democrats for Life of America's Pregnant Women Support Act, which sought to reduce abortion by supporting women experiencing unplanned pregnancies. Casey has voted against barring HHS grants to organizations that provide abortion services, where such services may often not be central to the organization's chief purpose.

In 2010, during a debate on the Affordable Care Act, Casey was heckled for his handling of the abortion provisions in the bill and for not taking an uncompromising anti-abortion stance. He was the primary sponsor of an amendment to prevent government funds from being used for abortion services, but when he tried to organize a compromise that appealed to the party's lone Senate holdout, Ben Nelson, he angered some religious groups.

In 2011, Casey voted against defunding Planned Parenthood and cutting funding for contraception, and for cloture for the nomination of Goodwin Liu, earning him a 100% rating from NARAL. The same year, Casey said he supported over-the-counter sale of the morning-after pill for emergency contraception. In the 2012 election, NARAL Pro-Choice America's election guide endorsed Casey.

In 2015 and 2018, Casey joined two other Democratic senators, Joe Manchin and Joe Donnelly, in voting for bills that would ban abortion after 20 weeks of pregnancy. In 2017, he voted for legislation that would have overturned the Mexico City Policy, which prohibits foreign aid for organizations that provide or promote abortion. His vote prompted anti-abortion activists to question his commitment to their cause. The National Right to Life Committee criticized Casey for his 2017 vote against the confirmation of Neil Gorsuch to the Supreme Court of the United States.

In 2018, Politico wrote:

After a decade in the Senate, Casey has become an increasingly reliable vote in support of abortion rights—scoring as high as 100 percent on NARAL Pro-Choice America's vote tally in 2016 and 2017 ... although his 2018 rating is sure to be lower.

Politico acknowledged that scorecards "are an imperfect calculation of a lawmaker's position", adding that Casey asserted that he had voted anti-abortion on 13 of the 15 abortion-related measures during his career. According to Politico, "Like conservative anti-abortion groups, [Casey] opposes the Roe decision and opposes the taxpayer funding of the [abortion] procedure. But like progressive abortion rights organizations, he supports Obamacare, access to contraception through programs such as Title X and funding for Planned Parenthood." Casey considers contraception a tool to reduce the demand for abortions. He has called on greater funding for access to contraceptives, specifically supporting Planned Parenthood's efforts to make them more accessible.

In 2022, Casey fully reversed his anti-abortion position and said he supported legislation to codify national abortion rights. He and 45 other senators voted to allow debate to continue on the Women's Health Protection Act in a roll-call vote on February 28. He voted for the measure again on May 11 in the wake of the leak of the Dobbs v. Jackson Women's Health Organization decision. He said that if the bill passed cloture, he would still vote for it.

=== Housing ===
In 2019, Casey was one of 41 senators to sign a letter to the housing subcommittee praising the United States Department of Housing and Urban Development's Section 4 Capacity Building program as authorizing "HUD to partner with national nonprofit community development organizations to provide education, training, and financial support to local community development corporations (CDCs) across the country" and expressing disappointment that President Trump's budget "has slated this program for elimination after decades of successful economic and community development." The senators wrote of their hope that the subcommittee would support continued funding for Section 4 in Fiscal Year 2020.

=== Immigration laws ===
Casey pushes for the Fend Off Fentanyl bill to help secure the border after the Republicans block the 2024 Bipartisan Border bill

Casey supported the Secure Borders, Economic Opportunity and Immigration Reform Act of 2007 (S. 1348), a bill voted down in the 110th United States Congress, which would have provided a path to legal citizenship for undocumented persons living in the U.S. He also supported the Clinton amendment, the Menendez amendment, and the Alaska amendments. During his 2006 Senate race, he expressed support for the Comprehensive Immigration Reform Act of 2006. Casey voted to continue federal funds for declared "sanctuary cities".

Casey took part in a Philadelphia International Airport protest against President Trump's January 2017 travel ban. Leaving a black-tie event to join the protest, he tweeted: "I won't stand by as the promise of America is diminished." In May, Casey, nine other senators, and 13 U.S. representatives requested in a letter to the Homeland Security Secretary that they stop the detention of four children and their mothers at the Berks County Residential Center. Many of the families had been detained there without legal recourse for more than a year and a half. Casey also personally took to social media with impassioned appeals to the White House on behalf of a Honduran 5-year-old and his 25-year-old mother being held at the facility who were facing deportation. They had fled violence and death threats and sought asylum in the U.S. in 2015, but failed their credible fear interview. Attorneys had been appealing their case, and the legal team was in the middle of the process of applying for Special Immigrant Juvenile Status for the child when they were awakened at 3:30AM on May 3 by Immigration and Customs Enforcement and put on a plane to Honduras. "This child and his mother deserved better from this Administration. They got the absolute worst", Casey said.

In 2019, Casey and six other Democratic senators led by Brian Schatz sent letters to the Government Accountability Office and the suspension and debarment official and inspector general at the Department of Health and Human Services citing recent reports that showed "significant evidence that some federal contractors and grantees have not provided adequate accommodations for children in line with legal and contractual requirements" and urging officials to determine whether federal contractors and grantees were in violation of contractual obligations or federal regulations and should thus face financial consequences.

=== Judicial nominees ===
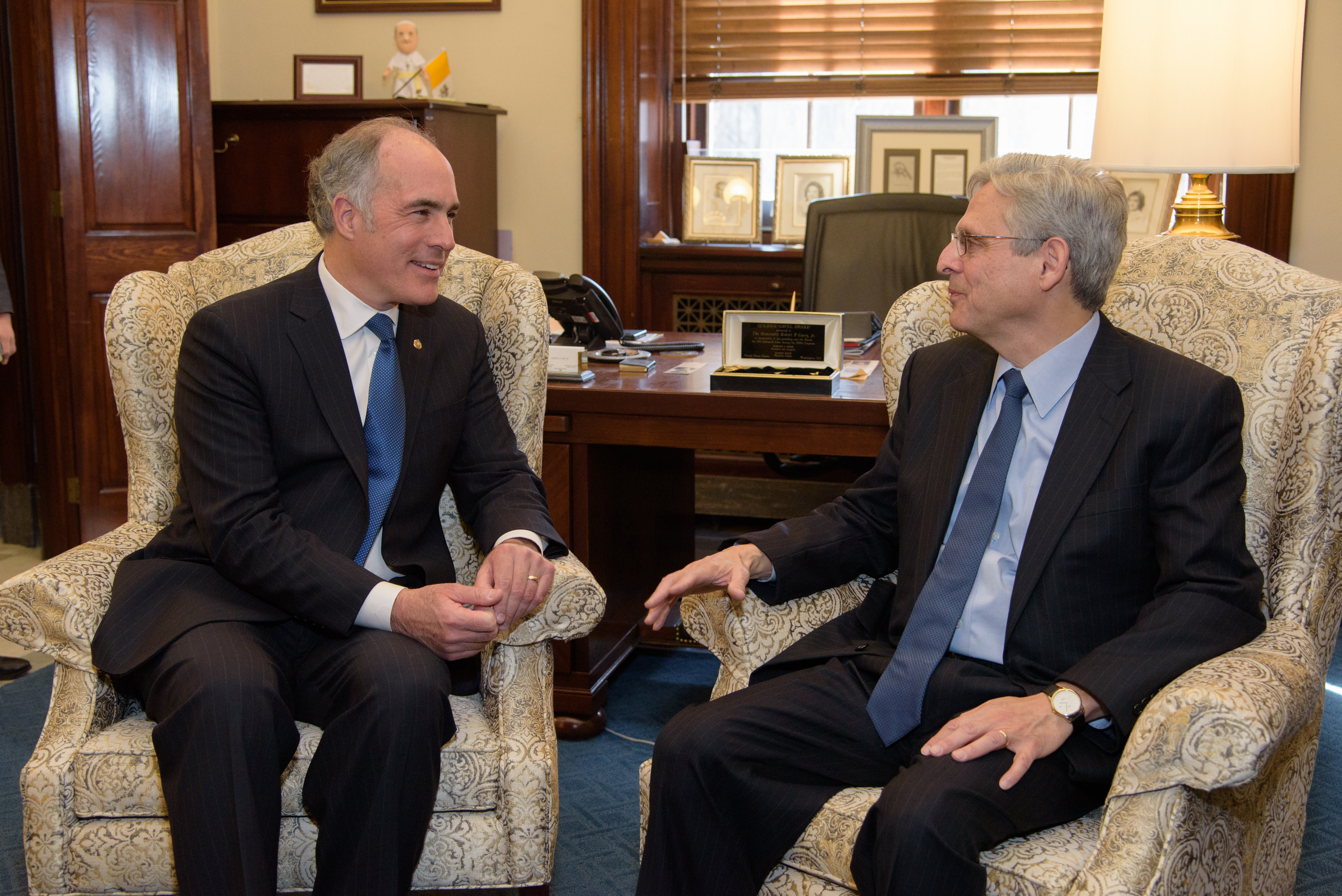
Casey meets with Merrick Garland whose Supreme Court nomination in 2016 the Senate Republicans blocked

Casey expressed support for the confirmation of both John Roberts in 2005 and Samuel Alito in 2006 to the Supreme Court of the United States; both were believed to be in favor of overturning Roe v. Wade.

He voted to confirm both Sonia Sotomayor in 2009 and Elena Kagan in 2010 to the Supreme Court of the United States.

Casey voted against confirming Neil Gorsuch in 2017 to the Supreme Court, citing "real concerns" about Gorsuch's "rigid and restrictive" judicial philosophy and some of his past opinions on issues relating to the health and safety of workers and the rights of those with disabilities. He also voted against the confirmation of Brett Kavanaugh to the Supreme Court in 2018. He voted against the confirmation of Amy Coney Barrett to the Supreme Court in 2020.

=== LGBT rights ===
Casey voted for the Don't Ask, Don't Tell Repeal Act of 2010. A longtime supporter of civil unions, Casey stated his support for same-sex marriage in 2013. He also supports the adoption of children by same-sex couples.

Casey was one of 18 senators to sign a letter in 2019 to United States Secretary of State Mike Pompeo requesting an explanation of a State Department decision not to issue an official statement that year commemorating Pride Month or issue the annual cable outlining activities for embassies commemorating Pride Month. They also asked why the LGBTI special envoy position had remained vacant and wrote, "preventing the official flying of rainbow flags and limiting public messages celebrating Pride Month signals to the international community that the United States is abandoning the advancement of LGBTI rights as a foreign policy priority."

== Personal life ==
Casey and his wife, Terese, were married in 1985, and have four children.

In 2023, Casey was treated for prostate cancer.

His brother Patrick Casey is a lobbyist who has reported lobbying the U.S. Senate on a number of issues.

Casey is Catholic.

In 2025, Casey joined the University of Scranton as a public service advisor.

== Electoral history ==
Pennsylvania Auditor General Primary Election, 1996
Party	Candidate	Votes	%	±%
Democratic	Robert P. Casey Jr.	252,645	34.6%	N/A
Democratic	Tom Foley	242,190	33.2%	N/A
Democratic	Bill Lloyd	128,500	17.6%	N/A
Democratic	Sandra Miller	105,868	14.5%	N/A
Majority		10,455	1.4%	N/A
Turnout		729,203		−32.2%

Pennsylvania Auditor General Election, 1996
Party	Candidate	Votes	%	±%
Democratic	Robert P. Casey Jr.	2,367,760	56.1%	+10.8%
Republican	Bob Nyce	1,706,835	40.4%	−10.7%
Libertarian	Sharon Shepps	103,234	2.4%	−1.2%
Constitution	Robert Lord	43,487	1.1%	N/A
Majority		514,204	12.2%	+9.8%
Turnout		4,221,316	65.3%	−1.0%
Democratic gain from Republican		Swing		

Pennsylvania Auditor General Election, 2000
Party	Candidate	Votes	%	±%
Democratic	Robert P. Casey Jr. (inc.)	2,651,551	56.8%	+0.7%
Republican	Katie True	1,862,934	39.9%	−0.5%
Green	Anne Goeke	62,642	1.3%	N/A
Libertarian	Jessica Morris	41,967	0.9%	−2.1%
Constitution	John Rhine	23,971	0.5%	−0.5%
Reform	James Blair	21,476	0.5%	N/A
Majority		638,561	13.6%	+1.4%
Turnout		4,664,541	63.1%	−2.2%
Democratic hold		Swing		

Pennsylvania Gubernatorial Primary Election, 2002
Party	Candidate	Votes	%	±%
Democratic	Ed Rendell	702,442	56.5%	N/A
Democratic	Robert P. Casey Jr.	539,794	43.5%	N/A
Majority		162,648	13.1%	N/A
Turnout		1,242,236	28.0%	+13%

Pennsylvania State Treasurer Election, 2004
Party	Candidate	Votes	%	±%
Democratic	Robert P. Casey Jr.	3,353,489	61.3%	+14.1%
Republican	Jean Craige Pepper	1,997,951	36.5%	−12.8%
Libertarian	Darryl Perry	61,238	1.1%	−0.4%
Green	Paul Teese	40,740	0.7%	−0.8%
Constitution	Max Lampenfeld	20,406	0.4%	−0.5%
Majority		1,233,154	22.5%	+24.0%
Turnout		5,473,824	68.9%	+5.8%
Democratic gain from Republican		Swing		

Pennsylvania U.S. Senate Primary Election, 2006
Party	Candidate	Votes	%	±%
Democratic	Robert P. Casey Jr.	629,271	84.5%	N/A
Democratic	Chuck Pennacchio	66,364	8.9%	N/A
Democratic	Alan Sandals	48,113	6.5%	N/A
Democratic	Others	1,114	0.1%	N/A
Majority		513,680	68.9%	N/A
Turnout		744,862		+1.3%

Pennsylvania U.S. Senate Election, 2006
Party	Candidate	Votes	%	±%
Democratic	Robert P. Casey Jr.	2,392,984	58.7%	+15.2%
Republican	Rick Santorum	1,684,778	41.3%	−17.4%
Majority		708,206	17.3%	+10.4%
Turnout		4,077,762	41.8%	+3.0%
Democratic gain from Republican		Swing	−24.4	

Pennsylvania U.S. Senate Primary Election, 2012
Party	Candidate	Votes	%	±%
Democratic	Robert P. Casey Jr.	565,488	80.9%	N/A
Democratic	Joseph Vodvarka	133,683	19.1%	N/A
Majority		431,805	61.8%	N/A
Turnout		699,171		−6.1%

United States Senate election in Pennsylvania, 2012
Party	Candidate	Votes	%	±%
Democratic	Robert P. Casey Jr.	3,021,364	53.7%	−4.9%
Republican	Tom Smith	2,509,114	44.6%	+3.3%
Libertarian	Rayburn Smith	96,926	1.7%	+1.7%
Majority		512,250	9.1%	−
Turnout		5,627,404		
Democratic hold		Swing	−4.9%	

United States Senate election in Pennsylvania, 2018
Party	Candidate	Votes	%	±%
Democratic	Bob Casey Jr.	2,792,437	55.74%	+2.05%
Republican	Lou Barletta	2,134,848	42.62%	−1.97%
Libertarian	Dale Kerns	50,907	1.02%	−0.70%
Green	Neal Gale	31,208	0.62%	N/A
Total votes		5,009,400	100.00%	N/A
Democratic hold				

United States Senate election in Pennsylvania, 2024
Party	Candidate	Votes	%	±%
Republican	David H McCormick	3,398,920	48.82%	+6.20%
Democratic	Robert P Casey Jr.	3,383,370	48.60%	−7.14%
Libertarian	John C Thomas	89,632	1.29%	+0.27%
Green	Leila Hazou	66,361	0.95%	+0.33%
Constitution	Marty Selker	23,616	0.34%	N/A
Total votes		6,961,899	100.00%	N/A
Republican gain from Democratic				

Party political offices
Preceded by Craig Lewis	Democratic nominee for Auditor General of Pennsylvania; 1996, 2000	Succeeded by Jack Wagner
Preceded by Catherine Baker Knoll	Democratic nominee for Treasurer of Pennsylvania; 2004	Succeeded by Rob McCord
Preceded by Ron Klink	Democratic nominee for U.S. Senator from Pennsylvania (Class 1); 2006, 2012, 2018, 2024	Most recent
Political offices
Preceded by Barbara Hafer	Auditor General of Pennsylvania; 1997–2005	Succeeded by Jack Wagner
Preceded by Barbara Hafer	Treasurer of Pennsylvania; 2005–2007	Succeeded by Robin Wiessmann
U.S. Senate
Preceded by Rick Santorum	U.S. Senator (Class 1) from Pennsylvania; 2007–2025; Served alongside: Arlen Specter, Pat Toomey, John Fetterman	Succeeded by Dave McCormick
Preceded by Claire McCaskill	Ranking Member of the Senate Aging Committee; 2017–2021	Succeeded by Susan Collins
Preceded by Susan Collins	Chair of the Senate Aging Committee; 2021–2025	Succeeded by Rick Scott
U.S. order of precedence (ceremonial)
Preceded by Frank Murkowski as Former U.S. Senator	Order of precedence of the United States as Former U.S. Senator	Succeeded by Bill Bradley as Former U.S. Senator
