= Julie Harhart =

American politician (born 1945)

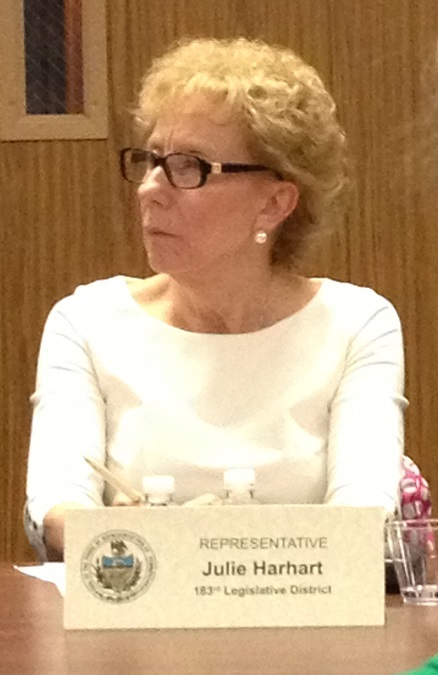

Member of the Pennsylvania House of Representatives from the 183rd district
- In office January 3, 1995 – January 3, 2017
- Preceded by: Frank Yandrisevits
- Succeeded by: Zach Mako

Personal details
- Born: August 7, 1945 (age 81) Northampton, Pennsylvania
- Party: Republican
- Spouse: Frank S. Harhart
- Children: Kim
- Education: Bethlehem Business School
- Website: http://julieharhart.com

Julie Harhart (born August 7, 1945) represented the 183rd Legislative District in the Pennsylvania House of Representatives, United States from 1994 to 2016. She was the Republican chair of the House Local Government Committee and a member of the House Professional Licensure Committee.

== Early life ==
Born in Northampton, Pennsylvania on August 7, 1945, Harhart graduated from Allentown Central Catholic High School in 1963 and from the Bethlehem Business School in 1965.

== Career ==
From 1981 to 1988, Harhart was employed as a tax collector in North Catasauqua, Pennsylvania. A constituent liaison, office manager and legislative aide to the Republican Caucus of Pennsylvania House of Representatives from 1990 to 1994, she was subsequently elected to the Pennsylvania House for its 1995 term and reelected. She then went on to serve an additional ten terms. Appointed to the Joint Legislative Air and Water Pollution Control and Conservation Committee in 1995, she served in that capacity until 2008). Appointed as Deputy Whip in 2007, she served in that leadership role until 2010. Appointed to the Joint Conservation Committee in 2009, she served in that capacity until 2016. She opted not to run for reelection to the House in 2016.
