= Nicholas Maiale =

American politician (1951–2025)

Nicholas J. Maiale

Member of the Pennsylvania House of Representatives from the 183rd district
- In office April 8, 1980 – January 5, 1993
- Preceded by: Matthew Cianciulli
- Succeeded by: Frank Yandrisevits

Personal details
- Born: August 1, 1951 Philadelphia, Pennsylvania, US
- Died: July 5, 2025 (aged 73) Philadelphia, Pennsylvania, US
- Party: Democratic

Nicholas J. Maiale (August 1, 1951 – July 5, 2025) was an American lawyer and politician who was a Democratic member of the Pennsylvania House of Representatives from 1980 to 1993.

Maiale, a native of South Philadelphia, was born on August 1, 1951, and was educated at Pennsylvania State University and Temple University Beasley School of Law. He practiced law in Philadelphia.

On March 11, 1980, Maiale was elected to the Pennsylvania House of Representatives in a special election, and took office on April 8. He retired from the House in 1992 and served as chairman of the Pennsylvania State Employees' Retirement System from 1993 to 2014.

Maiale had multiple sclerosis for most of his adult life, and was active with the Delaware Valley Multiple Sclerosis Society. He died in Philadelphia on July 5, 2025, at the age of 73.
