= Graver Arboretum =

Arboretum in Bath, Pennsylvania, United States

Coordinates: 40.8001°N 75.3635°W

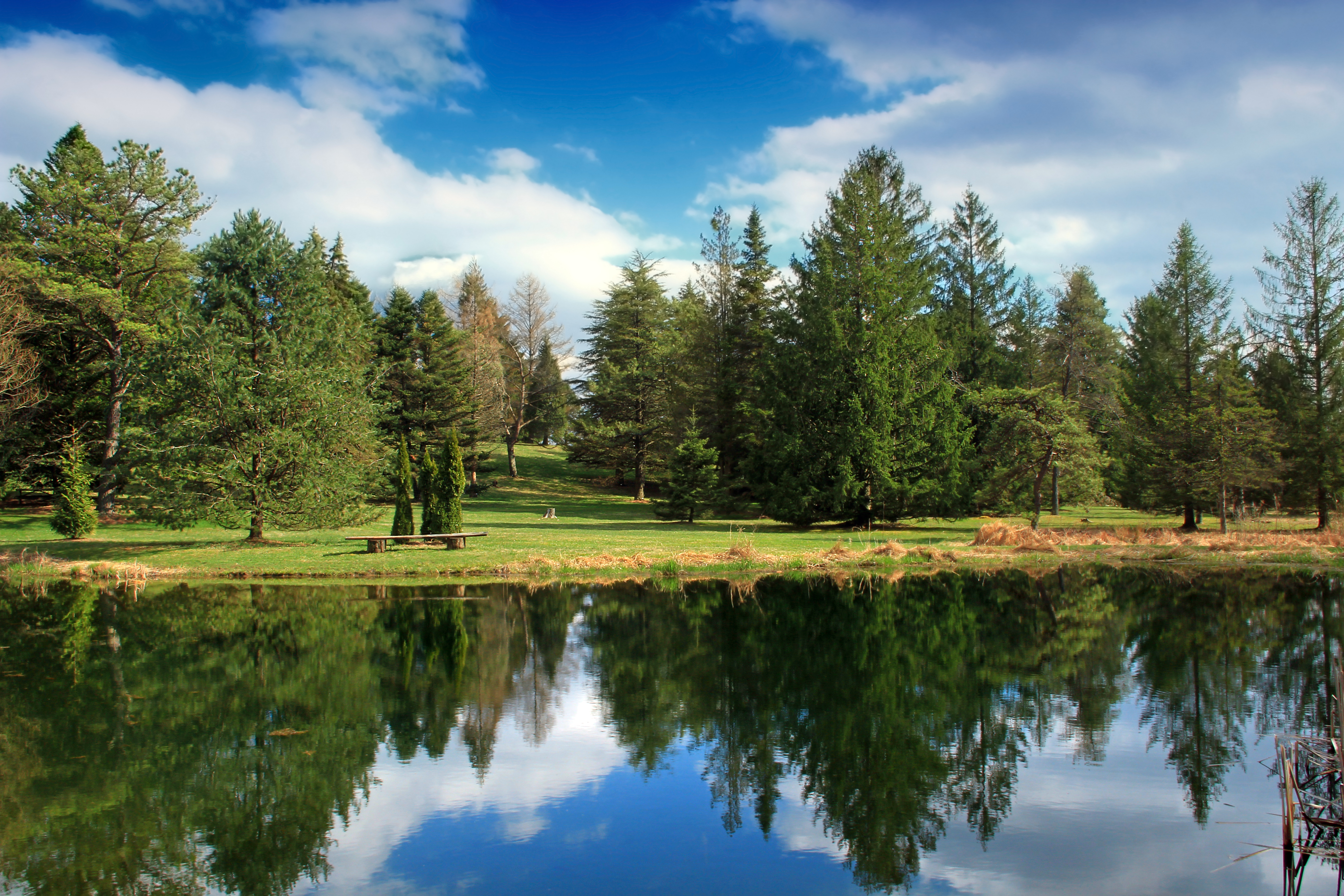
- Interactive map of Graver Arboretum
- Type: Arboretum
- Location: Bath, Pennsylvania
- Area: 63 acres (25 ha)
- Founder: Lee and Virginia Graver
- Owner: Muhlenberg College
- Open: Open daily
- Website: Official website

The Lee and Virginia Graver Arboretum is a 63 acres (25 ha) arboretum owned by Muhlenberg College and located at 1581 Bushkill Center Road in Bath, Pennsylvania. The arboretum is open daily without charge.

== History ==
The arboretum was established more than 40 years ago by Dr. Lee and Virginia Graver, who cultivated wildflowers, ferns, rhododendrons, and native and rare trees, including more than 150 conifer species. The Gravers donated their property to Muhlenberg College in 1994.

== Collections ==
Principal plant collections of the Lee and Virginia Graver Arboretum include:

- Conifers - Abies, Cedrus, Chamaecyparis, Cupressus, Juniperus, Larix, Metasequoia, Picea, Pinus, Pseudotsuga, Sequoiadendron, Taxodium, Thuja, Tsuga, and others.
- Wetland Plants - obligate (Alisma subcordatum, Bidens cernua, Brasenia schreberi, Chelone glabra, Cicuta maculata, Gentianopsis crinita, Juncus effusus, Leersia oryzoides, Ludwigia palustris, Lycopus americanus, Micranthes pensylvanica, Myosotis scorpioides, Persicaria hydropiper, Persicaria sagittata, Potamogeton sp., Sagittaria latifolia, Symplocarpus foetidus, Taxodium distichum, Typha latifolia; and facultative (Amelanchier arborea, Arisaema triphyllum, Betula alleghaniensis, Bidens comosa, Boehmeria cylindrica, Carex sp., Carpinus caroliniana, Echinocystis lobata, Eleocharis sp., Eupatorium perfoliatum, Eutrochium maculatum, Hamamelis virginiana, Impatiens capensis, Larix laricina, Lindera benzoin, Onoclea sensibilis, Osmundastrum cinnamomeum, Osmunda claytoniana, Ranunculus sp., Pilea pumila, Sambucus canadensis, Smilax herbacea, Thuja occidentalis, Toxicodendron radicans, Veratrum viride, and Zizia aurea).

== Gallery ==
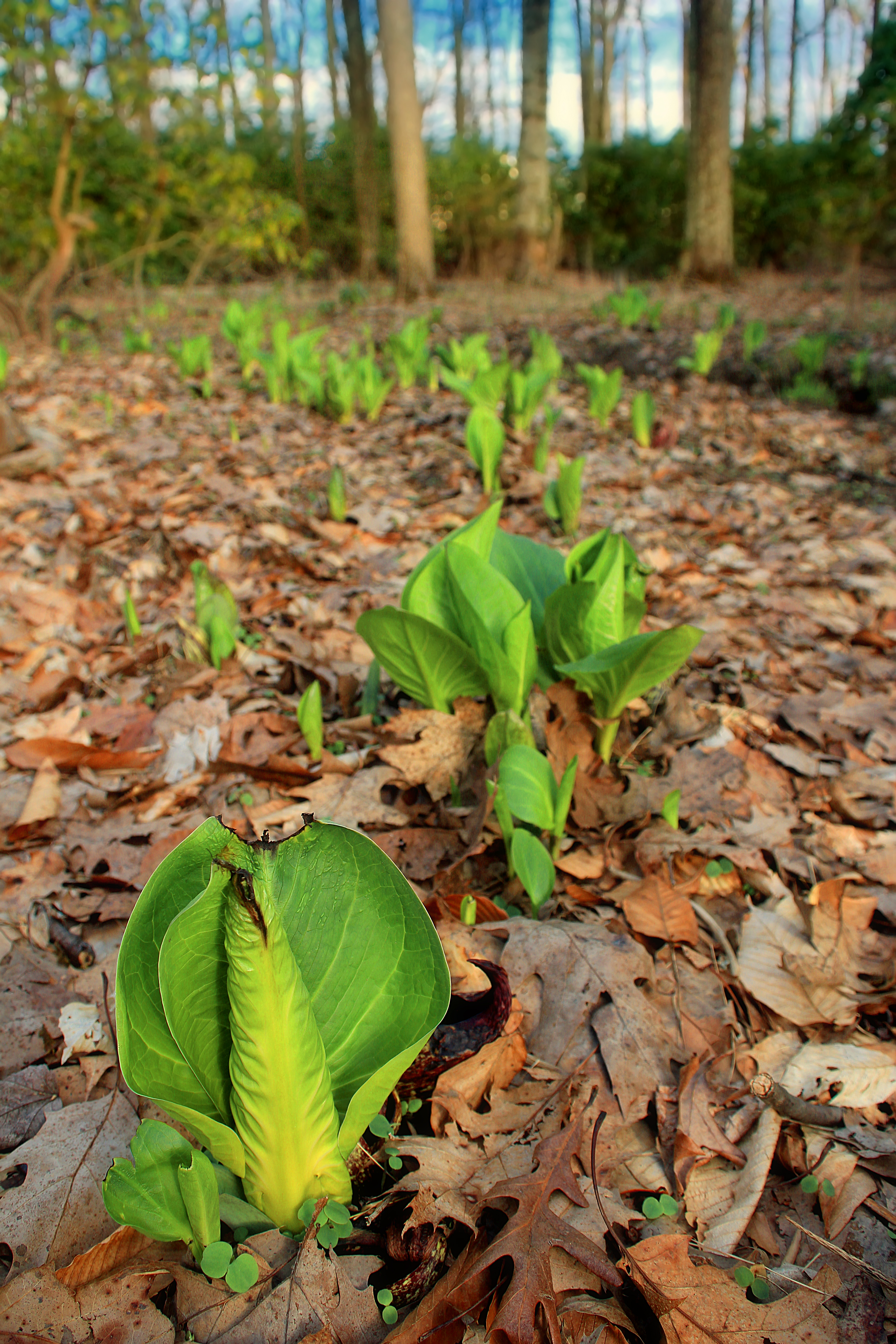

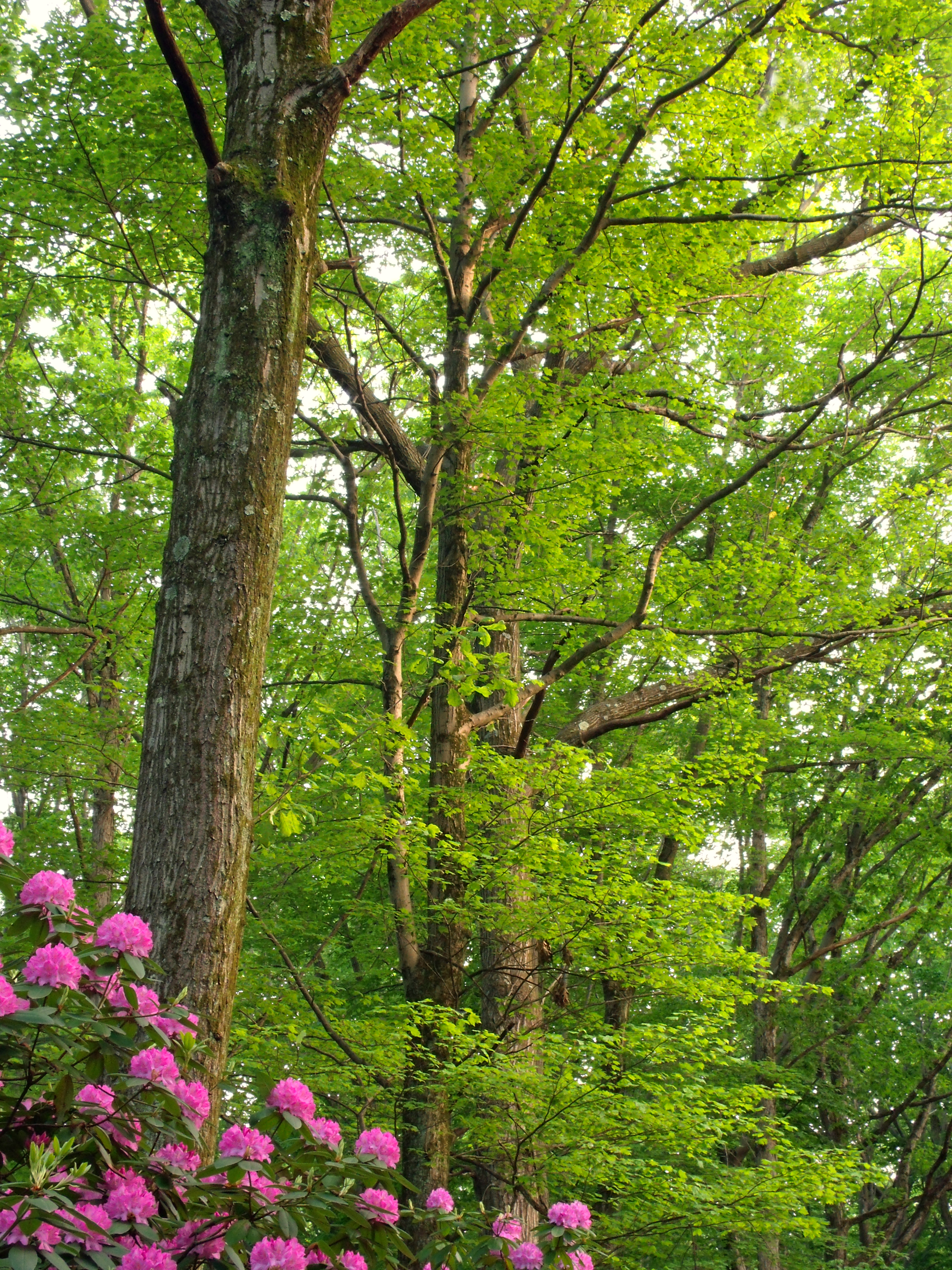

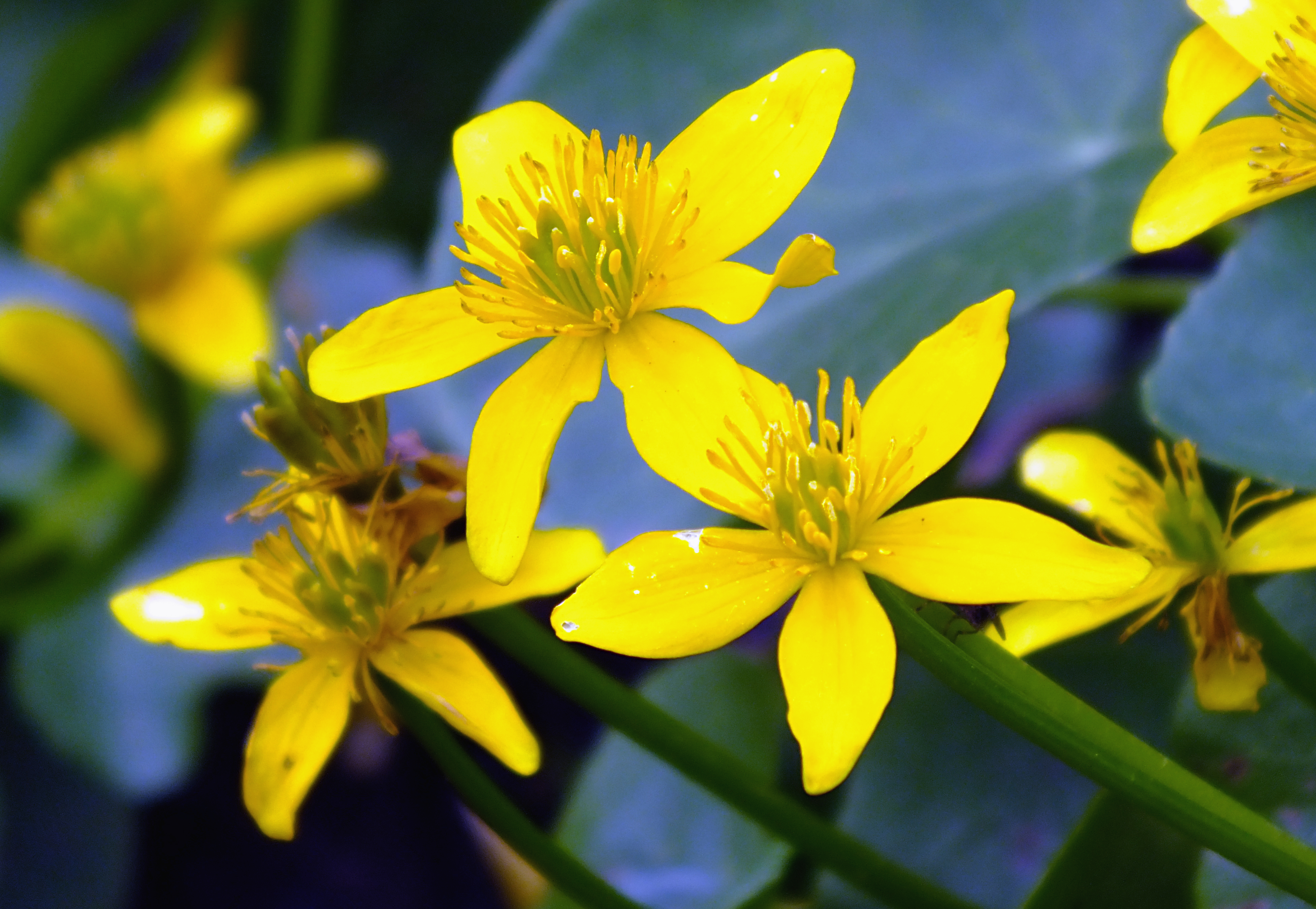

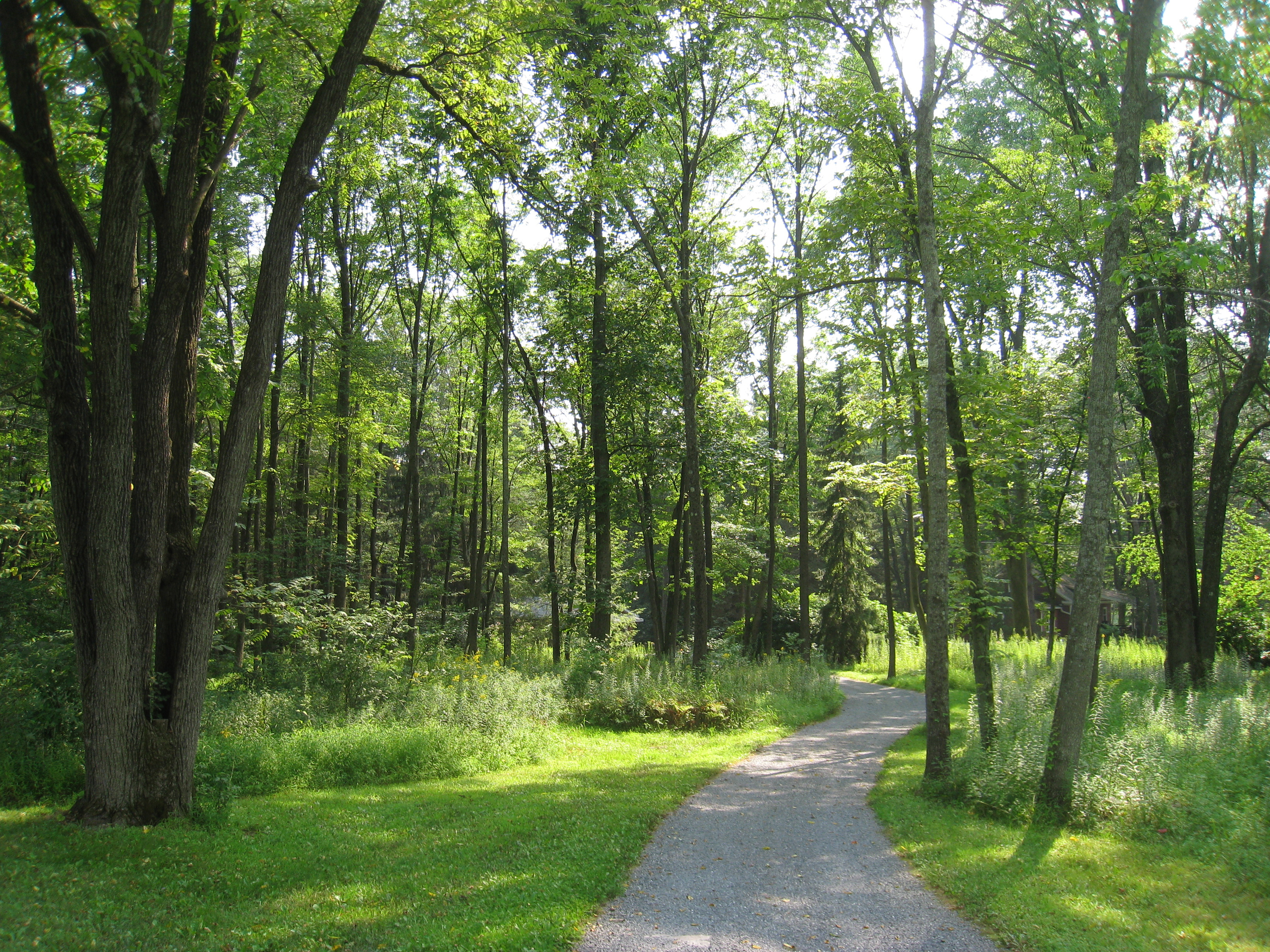

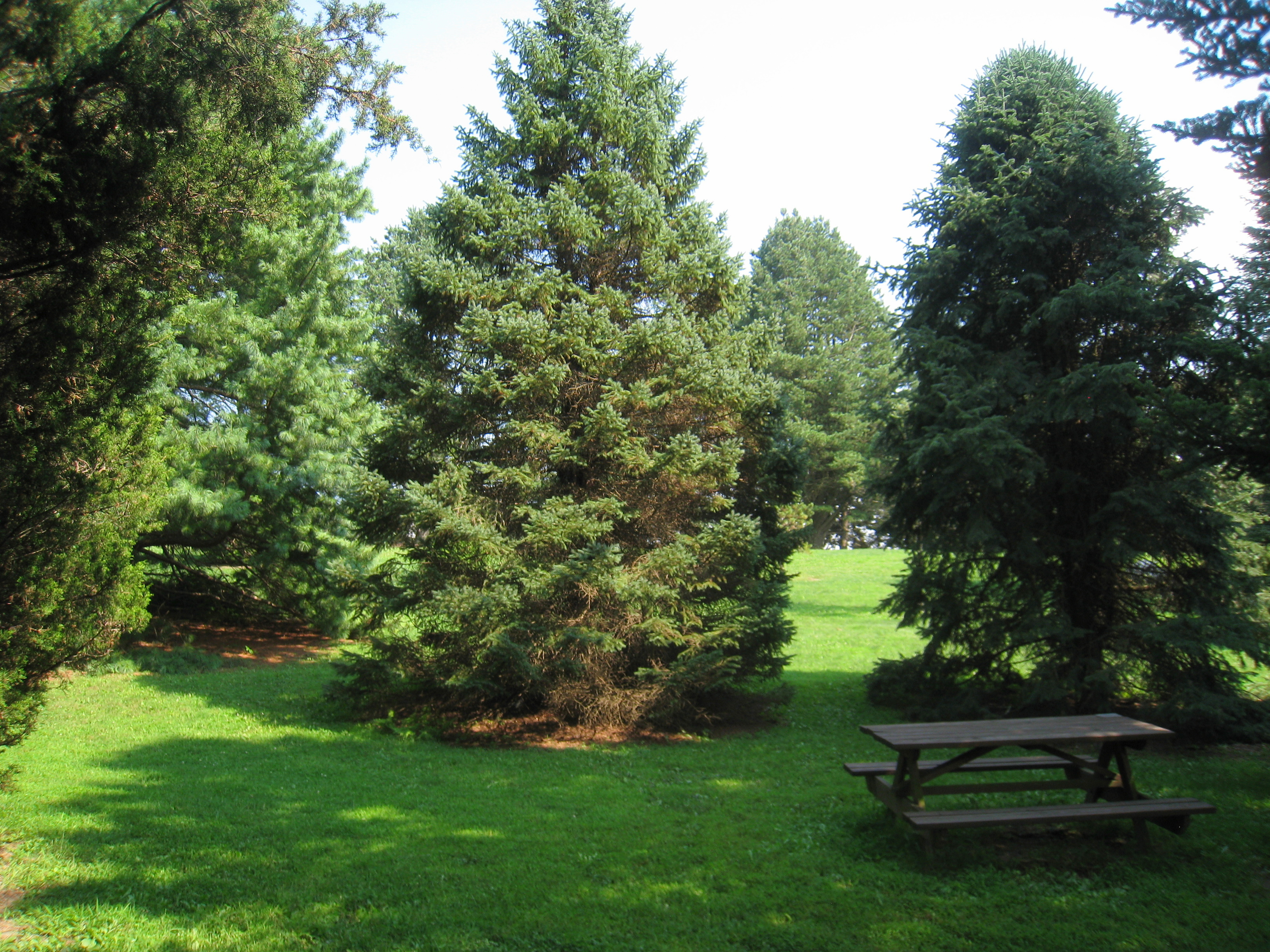

== See also ==
- List of botanical gardens in the United States
