= Bath, Pennsylvania =

Borough in Pennsylvania, US

- Borough
- Main Street, Bath, Pennsylvania in May 2025

- Seal
- Motto: History, Nestled with Friendship
- Location of Bath in Northampton County, Pennsylvania (left) and of Northampton County in Pennsylvania (right)

- Location of Bath in Pennsylvania Bath (the United States)
- Coordinates: 40°43′36″N 75°23′25″W
- Country: United States
- State: Pennsylvania
- County: Northampton
- Settled: 1728
- Founded: 1737
- Incorporated: February 1st, 1856
- Founder: Daniel Craig
- Named for: Bath, Somerset, England

Government
  - Mayor: Fiorella Reginelli Mirabito
  - Borough Council President: Frank Hesch

Area
  - Borough: 0.91 sq mi (2.36 km^{2})
  - Land: 0.90 sq mi (2.34 km^{2})
  - Water: 0.0077 sq mi (0.02 km^{2})
- Elevation: 432 ft (132 m)

Population (2020)
  - Borough: 2,682
  - Density: 2,947/sq mi (1,138/km^{2})
  - Metro: 865,310 (US: 68th)
- Demonym(s): Bathonian, Bathite
- Time zone: UTC-5 (EST)
  - Summer (DST): UTC-4 (EDT)
- ZIP Code: 18014
- Area codes: 610 and 484
- FIPS code: 42-04432
- Primary airport: Lehigh Valley International Airport
- Major hospital: Lehigh Valley Hospital–Cedar Crest
- School district: Northampton Area
- Website: Borough Website

Bath is a borough in Northampton County, Pennsylvania. As of the 2020 census, Bath had a population of 2,808. It is part of the Lehigh Valley metropolitan area, which had a population of 861,899 and was the 68th-most populous metropolitan area in the U.S. as of the 2020 census.

== History ==
Bath is located at the head of the Monocacy Creek in an area of the Lehigh Valley that was once rich in agriculture. The greater area of the town, however, lies east of the Monocacy Valley. Prior to European settlement, Bath was inhabited by the Lenape Indigenous tribe.

Bath was established in 1728 as a Scotch-Irish settlement before the American Revolution as the first settlement by white people in the Forks of the Delaware River. It is named for Bath, Somerset, England by Margaret DeLancey, who sold land under her father, lieutenant colonel of the Continental Army, William Allen, in the 1700s.

On March 3, 1737, the 247 acres of land that is currently inside the boundaries of Bath was purchased and surveyed for Daniel Craig. According to borough historians, this land spans from Chestnut Street to the north of Northampton Street. William Allen conveyed the greater part of Bath's land to his son, Andrew, in 1776, the same year that the Second Continental Congress in Philadelphia signed the Declaration of Independence, declaring its freedom from British colonial governance. That same year, Andrew Allen sold 150 acres of the land to John Lattimore. Andrew Allen also owned land west of the Monocacy, which was eventually confiscated and sold to local families in the area. Today, Bath's current acreage is 576 acres and is less than 1 sq. mi. in area.

Southeast of the town, a French and Indian War blockhouse was constructed to fortify the area from potential attacks. It was named Fort Ralston after the name of the farmer whose land it was built on. It is alternatively known as Brown's Fort, after the adjacent landowner. It was established as a fort in 1755, but likely abandoned by the end of the 1760s. Its ruins still remain in a small field south of a warehouse at the intersection of Airport Road and Nor-Bath Blvd known as Franks Corner, Pennsylvania. The ruins include a series of small underground chambers. Only one of the original buildings stand, with the larger barn having collapsed or disassembled sometime after 1916. There is evidence of fire damage to the fort and surrounding trees.

In the early 1900s Bath became the site of a growing cement industry. The Bath Portland Cement Company was the first plant to open, and its kiln can still be seen from Nor-Bath Blvd. The company was later replaced by the Keystone Cement Company, which still operates to this day and is a major employer and pillar of the Bath community. The Penn-Dixie Cement Company also quarried in east Bath, but no longer exists. The property around the quarry and ruins of the former plant are owned by Lehigh Hanson.

The Effort Foundry, a steel foundry from Effort, PA, moved to Bath in the early 1980s and employs around 70 people.

On August 18, 2012, Bath celebrated its 275th anniversary. In 1999, the Bath Business and Community Partnership (BBCP) was established for managing urban revitalization initiatives, including creating a greener town, organizing volunteers, and developing economic restructuring/asset enhancement.

== Geography ==
Bath is located at 40°43′36″N 75°23′25″W (40.726556, -75.390338). According to the U.S. Census Bureau, the borough has a total area of 0.9 square miles (2.3 km^{2}), all land. Bath is located 6 miles (9.7 km) north of Bethlehem and 4 miles (6.4 km) west of Nazareth.

Bath is also 100 miles (160 km) southwest of New York City and 60 miles (96 km) northwest of Philadelphia. It is also located near Wind Gap as well as the Delaware and Lehigh water gaps. Bath's elevation is 432 feet (132 m) above sea level as of 2011. The Borough is hilly and has many steep roads. There are two peaks in Bath, Hawk Mountain in the northeast, and Siegfried Hill in the southwest, which has been partially quarried out. Monocacy Creek, a tributary of the Lehigh River, flows through the town's center. The East Branch Monocacy also flows through Bath until their convergence further south. Other bodies of water include Penn-Dixie pond (the remains of a former quarry), the quarries at Keystone Cement, and numerous small ponds on the outskirts of town. Many mills operated using the flow of the Monocacy. Race and Mill street are named after them.

Bath stands on a layer of shale, limestone, and slate. The area is also rich in iron. The exploitation of limestone and slate found around bath has historically been a large industry for the town. Keystone Cement Co. holds the largest reserve of limestone deposits in the Lehigh Valley cement district.

Bath lies on the transition zone of the Dfa (humid continental) and Cfa (humid subtropical) climate zones. It has hot, humid summers and cool, snowy winters.

== Government ==
Bath's government involves a mayor, seven council members, and a tax collector. The current mayor is Fiorella ‘Fi’ Reginelli-Mirabito; Frank Hesch is Council President; Michele Ehrgott is Council Vice President. Before Hesch was president, Michele Ehrgott made local history as the first woman to serve as Borough Council President. The town's general budget is $1.6 million with an assessed valuation of over $53.1 million. Bath represents the 138th House of Representatives District, the 16th Senate District, and the 7th Congressional District.

== Demographics ==
Historical population
Census	Pop.	Note	%±
1860	486		—
1870	707		45.5%
1880	698		−1.3%
1890	723		3.6%
1900	731		1.1%
1910	1,057		44.6%
1920	1,401		32.5%
1930	1,625		16.0%
1940	1,720		5.8%
1950	1,824		6.0%
1960	1,736		−4.8%
1970	1,829		5.4%
1980	1,953		6.8%
1990	2,358		20.7%
2000	2,678		13.6%
2010	2,693		0.6%
2020	2,808		4.3%

As of the 2021 census estimates, there were 2,682 people living in Bath, a decrease of 0.4% from 2010. There are 1,344 males (50.1%) and 1,338 females (49.9%). The population density was 2,947 people per square mile . There were 1,221 housing units at an average density of 1,357 per square mile. Racially, the borough consists of 79% White, 6.6% African American, 0.3% Native American, 0.5% Asian, and 8.2% from two or more races.

The percentage of married families in Bath is 37.7%, cohabitating couples 18.7%, male householders without a partner 15.9%, and female householders without a partner 27.6%. The number of people over the age of 25 with at least a high school diploma is 90.2%. Those with a bachelor's degree or higher is 18.9% and residents with a graduate or professional degree is 5.2%. The unemployment percentage in 2021 was 7%. In 2020, the median income for a household in the borough was $53,250 and the per capita income for the borough was $23,233.

The average house or condo value was $170,900 and the average cost for rent was $1,189. About 14% of families and 17.8% of the population were below the poverty line.

== Community organizations ==
Bath is home to several organizations, including American Legion Eckley E. Patch Post 470, the BBCP, the Bath-East Allen Youth Club, Bath Improvements Committee, Bath Museum Committee, Bath Lions Club, Bath Lioness Club, Bath Lions Midget Football Committee, Governor Wolf Historical Society, Historical Architectural Review Board, Mid-County Senior Center, the Park, Recreation, and Shade Tree Commission, and Crime Watch. Also, the Monocacy Creek Watershed Association is active in Bath, which helps protect the Monocacy Creek. They hold creek cleanups and other conservation efforts throughout the year.

The four recreational areas in Bath include the Volunteer Firefighter's Park, Keystone Park, Ciff Cowling Field, and Carl L. Rehrig Park.

== Locations ==
- Bath Farmer's Market is located adjacent to the American Legion on Rt. 329 and offers local, fresh products from vegetables and bakery items to handmade soap. It is open from May–September on Fridays from 3-7 p.m.
- The Wesselhoeft House was the first homeopathic school of medicine, located on Chestnut Street in 1829.
- The Bath Museum is located at the municipal building. Items from the 1800s and up are displayed and the committee who runs the museum are responsible for the permanent care of the artifacts. The Bath Museum is open 10:00 A.M. – 2:00 P.M. every third (3rd) Saturday of the month with the exception of December, when it will be open the first (1st) Saturday, per the Museum's website.
- The Daniel Steckel House was added to the National Register of Historic Places in 1982. Daniel Steckel built this house for his wife, Rebecca, in 1804, and raised 6 children. Steckel was a prominent man in Bath in the 1800s and lived to be 101 years old. The house was featured in Early American Life magazine in October 2011 and is registered with the National Register, the Pennsylvania Inventory of Historic Places, and the Bath Historic District. It is currently a bed-and-breakfast.
- Graver Arboretum, owned by Muhlenberg College and located in Bath, has free admission and features native and rare trees and various species of flowers.
- Sacred Heart of Jesus Parish is a Catholic church located on Washington Street. After the affiliated Sacred Heart School closed, Kolbe Academy Recovery High School has opened at the location.
- Malta Hall is a building located at 143 E Main Street Bath, Pennsylvania. It was built in 1855. In 1874, it was Bath Marbleworks, which was owned by Jeremiah Reinhard. It manufactured marble mantels, tombstones, monuments, and brownstone. After the marbleworks left, it became Carpenter Hall, then Bath High School, Scout Hall, Bath Public Library, and more. It is now a private home.

== Transportation ==
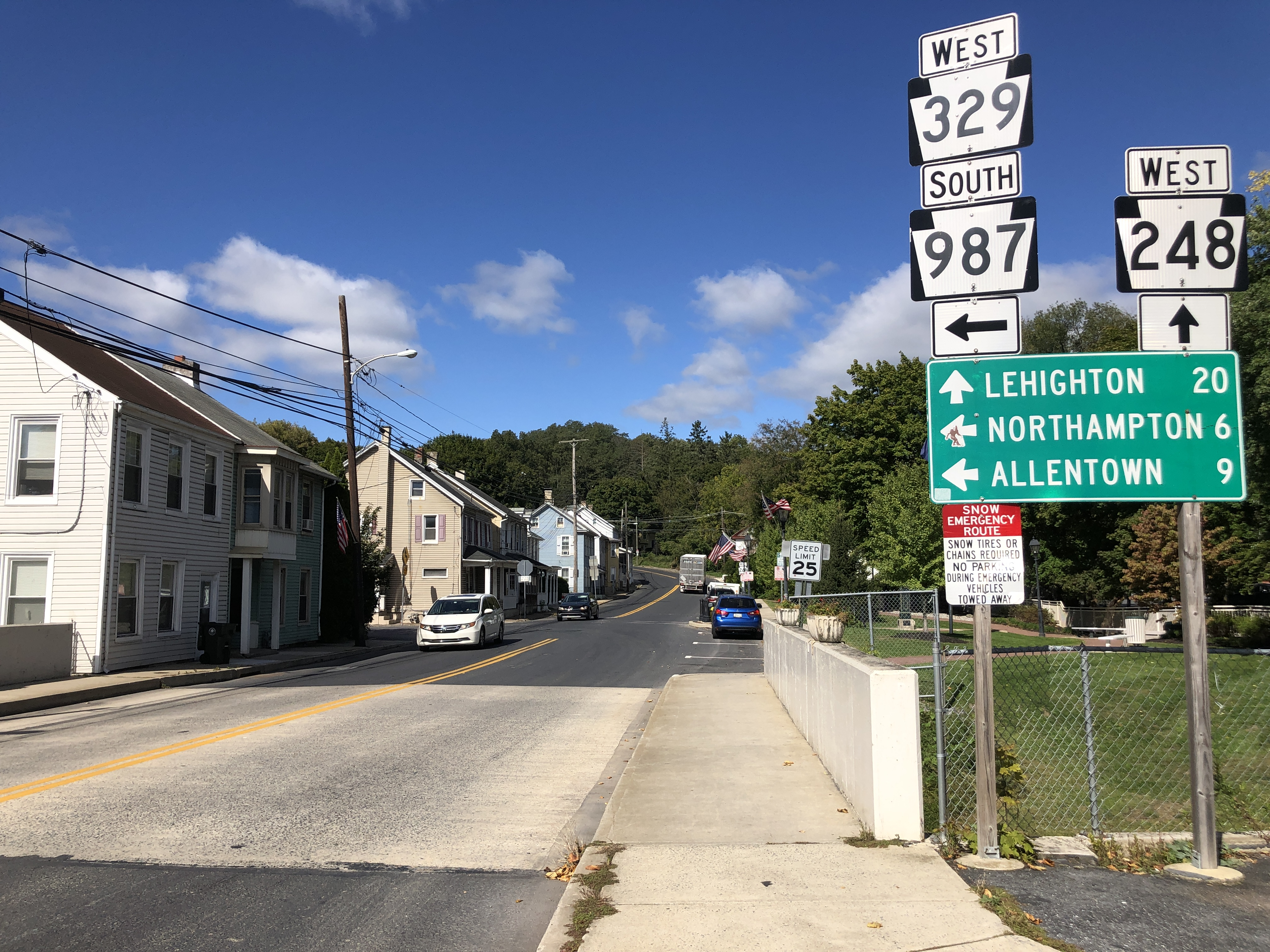
PA Route 248 West and PA Route 987 South in Bath

As of 2007, there were 10.79 miles (17.36 km) of public roads in Bath, of which 4.65 miles (7.48 km) were maintained by the Pennsylvania Department of Transportation (PennDOT) and 6.14 miles (9.88 km) were maintained by the borough.

Numbered highways passing through Bath include Pennsylvania Route 248, Pennsylvania Route 329, Pennsylvania Route 512 and Pennsylvania Route 987. PA 248 follows an east–west alignment through the borough via West Main Street, Chestnut Street and Northampton Street. PA 329 begins at PA 248 and heads southwest along Race Street. PA 512 follows a north–south alignment via Walnut Street. Finally, PA 987 follows a north–south alignment via Race Street, West Main Street and Chestnut Street, including a concurrency with PA 329 and another with PA 248.

Bath was once home to a trolley line that went to Nazareth. There was also the Northampton and Bath railroad, a local line that ran between Bath and Northampton for 8 miles and is now a biking and walking path since it shut down in 1978. One mile of track is still used by local businesses located on Atlas cement grounds.

== Education ==
The borough is served by the Northampton Area School District. Students in grades nine through 12 attend Northampton Area High School in Northampton.

The borough is also home to George Wolf Elementary School, which opened in 1968. It has twenty-three classrooms, a library, music room and a multipurpose room. In 1974, additions were added that included a gymnasium and twelve more classrooms. They also have three Intermediate Unit #20 classrooms. George Wolf Elementary School is named after George Wolf, a local resident and Governor of Pennsylvania from 1829 to 1835. He is known as the father of the free public school system in Pennsylvania because of his effort in passing of the Free School Act of 1834. His original Wolf Academy is located approximately one mile from the school.

In 1920, Sacred Heart Catholic School opened on Washington Street. It closed in 2020 in its centennial. As of 2022, Kolbe Academy Recovery High School is now located at the former Sacred Heart School. It is the first Catholic recovery school in the United States.

== Media ==
The Home News is a weekly newspaper focusing on Bath and surrounding communities. It was first published in 1942.

The Borough runs a YouTube channel which gives monthly news updates and coverage of local events.

== Notable people ==
- Matt Christopher (1917–1997), children's author
- Arthur Granville Dewalt (1854–1931), U.S. Congressman
- David Engleman (1835–1913), Pennsylvania State Senator and Representative
