= Ars Mathematica Contemporanea =

- Discipline: Mathematics
- Language: English
- Edited by: Klavdija Kutnar, Dragan Marušič, Tomaž Pisanski

Publication details
- History: 2008–present
- Publisher: University of Primorska in collaboration with the Society of Mathematicians, Physicists and Astronomers of Slovenia, the Institute of Mathematics, Physics, and Mechanics, and the Slovenian Discrete and Applied Mathematics Society (Slovenia)
- Frequency: Quarterly
- Open access: Yes
- License: Creative Commons Attribution 4.0
- Impact factor: 0.910 (2018)

Standard abbreviations
- ISO 4: Ars Math. Contemp.

Indexing
- ISSN: 1855-3966 (print); 1855-3974 (web)
- LCCN: 2010215334
- OCLC no.: 896855161

Links
- Journal homepage; Online access; Online archive

Ars Mathematica Contemporanea is a quarterly peer-reviewed scientific journal covering discrete mathematics in connection with other branches of mathematics. It is published by the University of Primorska together with the Society of Mathematicians, Physicists and Astronomers of Slovenia, the Institute of Mathematics, Physics, and Mechanics, and the Slovenian Discrete and Applied Mathematics Society. It is a platinum open access journal, with articles published under the Creative Commons Attribution 4.0 license.

== Abstracting and indexing ==
The journal is indexed by:

- Current Contents/Physical, Chemical & Earth Sciences
- Mathematical Reviews
- Science Citation Index Expanded
- Scopus
- zbMATH

According to the Journal Citation Reports, the journal has a 2018 impact factor of 0.910.

== See also ==
- List of academic journals published in Slovenia
