= Marušič =

Marušič is a Slovene matronymic surname, mostly present in western Slovenia (the Slovenian Littoral) and in the Slovene-inhabited areas of Friuli-Venezia Giulia, Italy. The name derives from the female personal name Maruša, which is a diminutive of Marija, Mary. The surname thus means something like "the descendant of Mary", or "the one from Mary's family".

It may refer to:

- Andrej Marušič, Slovenian psychiatrist
- Branko Marušič, Slovenian historian
- Dorjan Marušič, Slovenian physician and politician, Minister of Health of Slovenia
- Dragan Marušič, Slovenian mathematician
- Drago Marušič, Yugoslav politician
- Fedja Marušič, Slovenian sportsman
- Fran Marušič, Anti-Fascist activist, member of the TIGR organization
- Ivan Marušič, Slovenian architect
- Lovrenc Marušič, Slovene 18th century monk and playwright
- Tomaž Marušič, Slovenian politician
- Jernej Marušič, Slovene DJ (known as Octex)
- Jurij Marušič, Slovene police officer

A variant of the surname is Marussig. For example:

- Piero Marussig, Italian painter

== See also ==
- Marušić
