= Tomaž Pisanski =

Slovenian mathematician (born 1949)

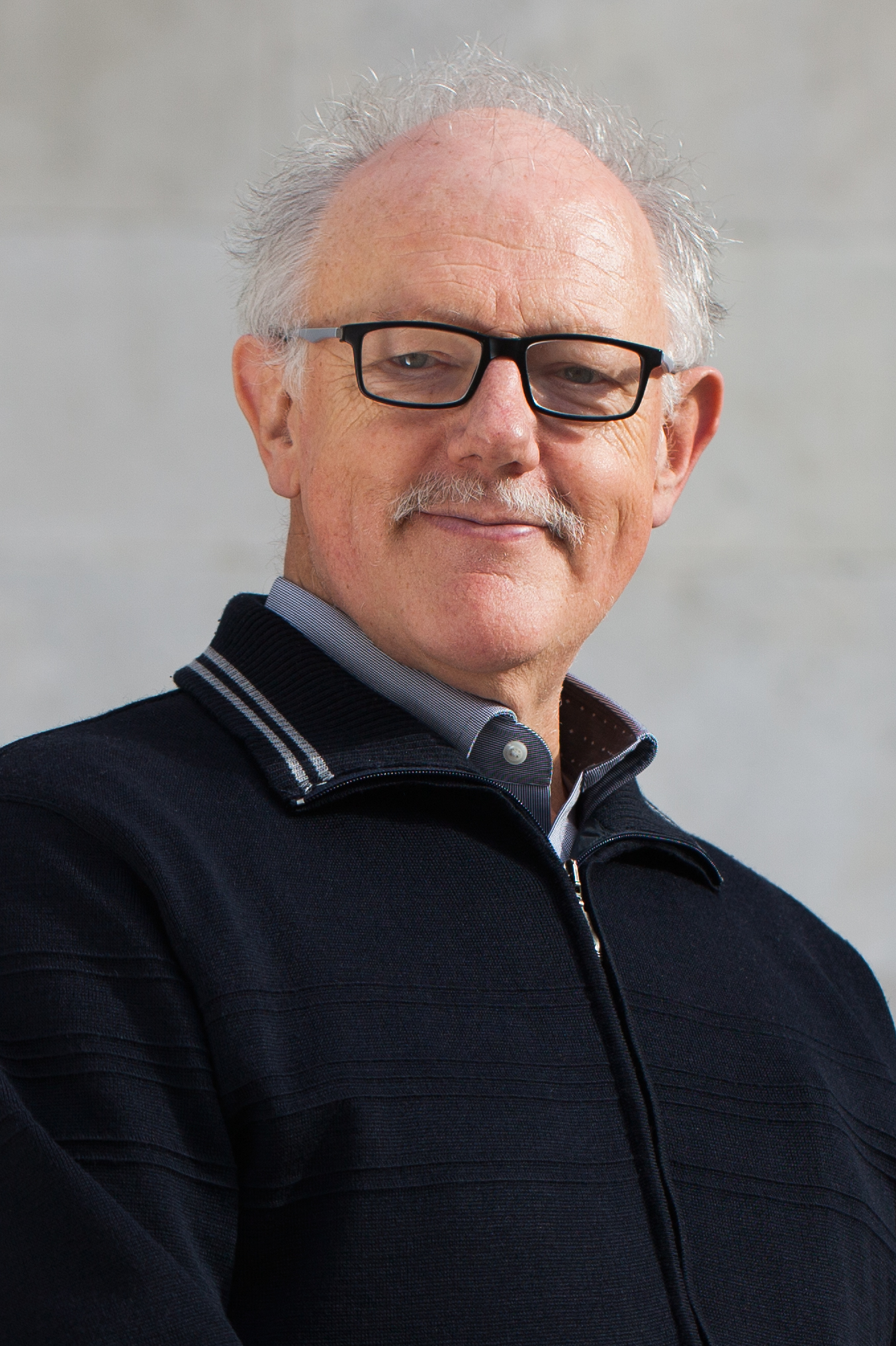
- Born: 24 May 1949 (age 77); Ljubljana, Yugoslavia
- Education: University of Ljubljana, Pennsylvania State University
- Scientific career
- Fields: Topological graph theory, Algebraic graph theory, Discrete mathematics, Configuration (geometry).
- Workplaces: University of Primorska
- Doctoral advisor: Torrence Parsons
- Doctoral students: Vladimir Batagelj; Sandi Klavžar; Bojan Mohar

Tomaž (Tomo) Pisanski (born 24 May 1949 in Ljubljana, Yugoslavia, which is now in Slovenia) is a Slovenian mathematician working mainly in discrete mathematics and graph theory. He is considered by many Slovenian mathematicians to be the "father of Slovenian discrete mathematics."

== Biography ==
As a high school student, Pisanski competed in the 1966 and 1967 International Mathematical Olympiads as a member of the Yugoslav team, winning a bronze medal in 1967. He studied at the University of Ljubljana where he obtained a B.Sc, M.Sc and PhD in mathematics. His 1981 PhD thesis in topological graph theory was written under the guidance of Torrence Parsons. He also obtained an M.Sc. in computer science from Pennsylvania State University in 1979.

Currently, Pisanski is a professor of discrete and computational mathematics and Head of the Department of Information Sciences and Technology at University of Primorska in Koper. In addition, he is a professor at the University of Ljubljana Faculty of Mathematics and Physics (FMF). He has been a member of the Institute of Mathematics, Physics and Mechanics (IMFM) in Ljubljana since 1980, and the leader of several IMFM research projects. In 1991 he established the Department of Theoretical Computer Science at IMFM, of which he has served as both head and deputy head.

He has taught undergraduate and graduate courses in mathematics and computer science at the University of Ljubljana, University of Zagreb, University of Udine, University of Leoben, California State University, Chico, Simon Fraser University, University of Auckland and Colgate University. Pisanski has been an adviser for M.Sc and PhD students in both mathematics and computer science. Notable doctoral students include Vladimir Batagelj, Bojan Mohar, and Sandi Klavžar.

== Research ==
Pisanski’s research interests span several areas of discrete and computational mathematics, including combinatorial configurations, abstract polytopes, maps on surfaces, chemical graph theory, and the history of mathematics and science. In 1980 he calculated the genus of the Cartesian product of any pair of connected, bipartite, d-valent graphs using a method that was later called the White–Pisanski method. In 1982 Vladimir Batagelj and Pisanski proved that the Cartesian product of a tree and a cycle is Hamiltonian if and only if no degree of the tree exceeds the length of the cycle. They also proposed a conjecture concerning cyclic Hamiltonicity of graphs. Their conjecture was proved in 2005. With Brigitte Servatius he is the co-author of the book Configurations from a Graphical Viewpoint (2013).

== Selected publications ==
- Pisanski, T. Genus of Cartesian products of regular bipartite graphs, Journal of Graph Theory 4 (1), 1980, 31-42. doi:10.1002/jgt.3190040105
- Graovac, A., T. Pisanski. On the Wiener index of a graph, Journal of Mathematical Chemistry 8 (1),1991, 53-62. doi:10.1007/BF01166923
- Boben, M., B. Grunbaum, T. Pisanski, A. Zitnik, Small triangle-free configurations of points and lines, Discrete & Computational Geometry 35 (3), 2006, 405-427. doi:10.1007/s00454-005-1224-9
- Conder, M., I. Hubard, T. Pisanski. Constructions for chiral polytopes, Journal of the London Mathematical Society 77 (1), 2007, 115-129. doi:10.1112/jlms/jdm093
- Pisanski, T. A classification of cubic bicirculants, Discrete Mathematics 307 (3-5), 2007, 567-578. doi:10.1016/j.disc.2005.09.053

== Professional life ==
From 1998-1999, Pisanski was chairman of the Society of Mathematicians, Physicists and Astronomers of Slovenia (DMFA Slovenije); he was appointed an honorary member in 2015. He is a founding member of the International Academy of Mathematical Chemistry, serving as its vice president from 2007 to 2011. In 2008, together with Dragan Marušič, he founded Ars Mathematica Contemporanea, the first international mathematical journal to be published in Slovenia. In 2012 he was elected to the Academia Europaea. He was the president of the Slovenian Discrete and Applied Mathematics Society (SDAMS) from its conception until December 12, 2024. SDAMS is the first Eastern European mathematical society not wholly devoted to theoretical mathematics to be accepted as a full member of the European Mathematical Society (EMS).

== Awards and honors ==
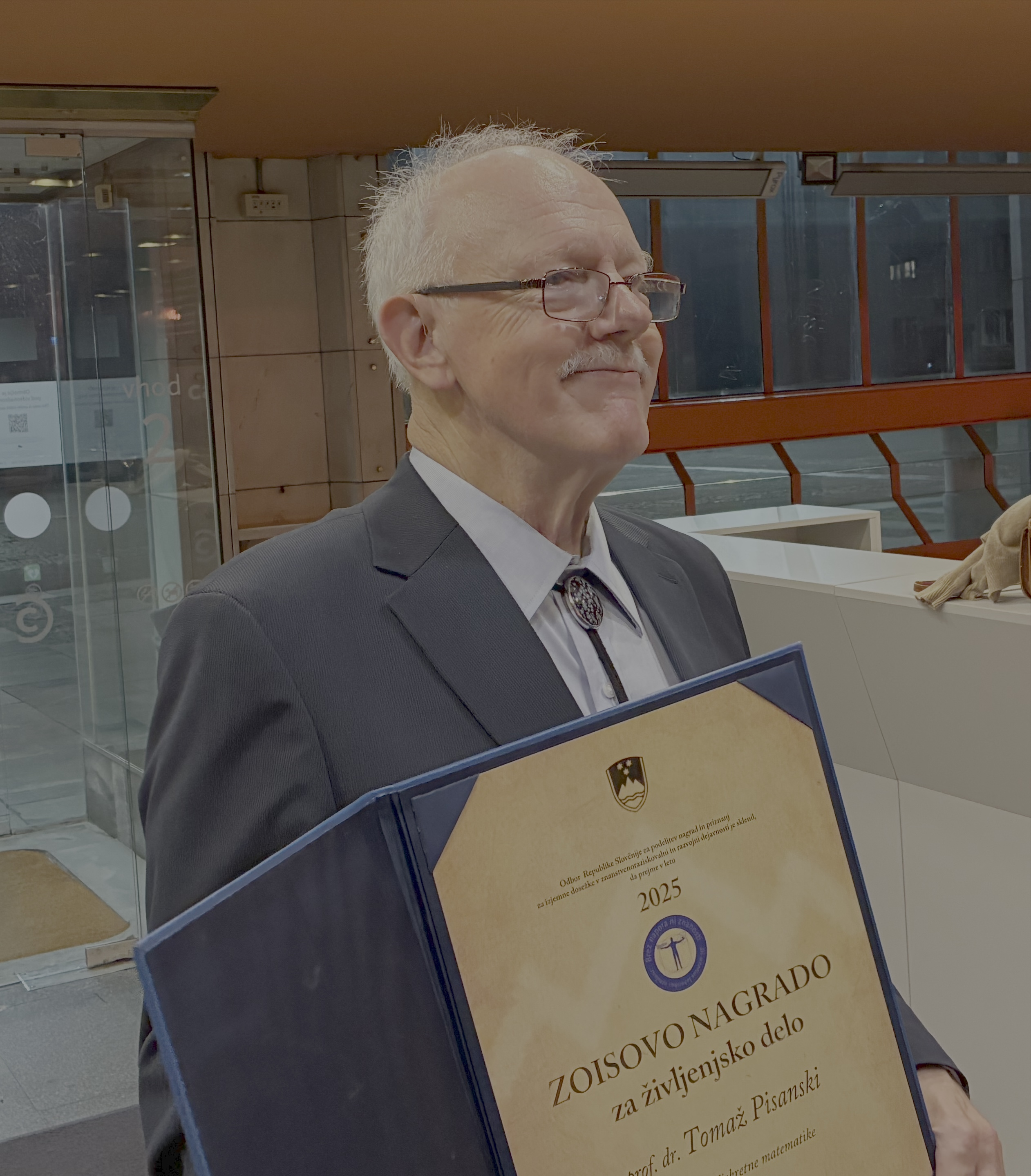
Pisanski with Zois Lifetime Achievement award in November 2025

In 2005, Pisanski was decorated with the Order of Merit (Slovenia), and in 2015 he received the Zois award for exceptional contributions to discrete mathematics and its applications. In 2016, he received the Donald Michie and Alan Turing Prize for lifetime achievements in Information Science in Slovenia. In 2025, Pisanski was awarded a Zois Lifetime Achievement Award.
