= Bojan Mohar =

Slovenian and Canadian mathematician (born 1956)

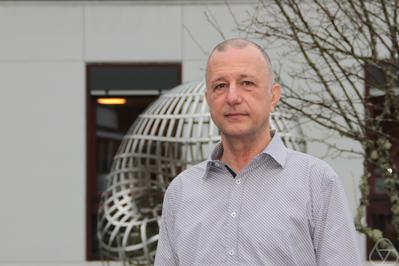
- Mohar at Oberwolfach in 2022
- Born: September 21, 1956
- Education: University of Ljubljana(PhD, 1986)
- Scientific career
- Fields: Mathematics
- Workplaces: University of Ljubljana; Simon Fraser University; Institute of Mathematics, Physics, and Mechanics
- Thesis: Grafi v kombinatorični topologiji (Graphs in combinatorial topology) (1986)
- Doctoral advisor: Tomaž Pisanski
- Website: https://www.sfu.ca/~mohar/

Bojan Mohar (born September 21, 1956) is a Slovenian and Canadian mathematician, working in graph theory. He is a professor of mathematics at the University of Ljubljana and the holder of a Canada Research Chair in graph theory at Simon Fraser University in Vancouver, British Columbia, Canada.

== Education ==
Mohar received his PhD from the University of Ljubljana in 1986, under the supervision of Tomo Pisanski.

== Research ==
Mohar's research concerns topological graph theory, algebraic graph theory, graph minors, and graph coloring.

With Carsten Thomassen he is the co-author of the book Graphs on Surfaces (Johns Hopkins University Press, 2001).

== Books ==
- Mohar, Bojan; Thomassen, Carsten (2001). Graphs on surfaces. Baltimore: Johns Hopkins University Press. ISBN 0-8018-6689-8. OCLC 45102952.

== Awards and honors ==
Mohar was a Fulbright visiting scholar at Ohio State University in 1988, and won the Boris Kidrič prize of the Socialist Republic of Slovenia in 1990. He has been a member of the Slovenian Academy of Engineering since 1999. He was named a SIAM Fellow in 2018. He was elected as a Fellow of the American Mathematical Society in the 2020 Class, for "contributions to topological graph theory, including the theory of graph embedding algorithms, graph coloring and crossing numbers, and for service to the profession".
