= Joe Vignola =

American politician

Member of the Philadelphia City Council from the 1st District
- In office January 6, 1992 – April 1, 1995
- Preceded by: James Tayoun
- Succeeded by: Frank DiCicco

Philadelphia City Controller
- In office January 2, 1984 – December 15, 1987
- Preceded by: Thomas Leonard^{[a]}
- Succeeded by: Jonathan Saidel^{[b]}

Personal details
- Born: August 11, 1949 (age 77)
- Party: Democratic
- Education: The University of Pennsylvania; Temple University; Harvard University
- Profession: Politician; Investment Advisor
- a.John Smithyman had served as Acting Controller from the time of Leonard's resignation, until Vignola was elected to the office. a.John Smithyman was again appointed Acting Controller following Vignola's resignation, and served until Saidel was elected.

Joseph C. Vignola, Sr. (born August 11, 1949) is an American Democratic politician from Philadelphia, Pennsylvania.

== Political career ==
=== City Controller ===
In November 1982, Philadelphia City Controller Thomas Leonard resigned his post and announced his intention to run for Mayor (he would ultimately lose the Democratic nomination to Wilson Goode). Vignola ran to succeed him, and was elected in November 1983.

=== Senate candidacy ===
Vignola resigned the office of City Controller in December 1987, and subsequently announced his intention to challenge incumbent Republican Senator John Heinz in the 1988 election. Heinz, who was seeking his third term in the Senate, had amassed considerable political clout, having most recently served as Chairman of the National Republican Senatorial Committee. Vignola's candidacy struggled to gain traction, and he was ultimately defeated by over 30 percentage points, or roughly 1.5 million votes, while only carrying one county across the state–Philadelphia.

=== City Council tenure and return to private life ===
In 1991, Vignola announced his intention to challenge incumbent Democratic Councilman James Tayoun for his First District on the Philadelphia City Council. Tayoun eventually announced his intention to retire rather than seek re-election amid a federal investigation into alleged tax fraud. His candidacy was supported by his cousin, Democratic power broker and former State Senator Buddy Cianfrani, and Vignola eventually scored a narrow victory former Republican State Representative Connie McHugh in the fall general election.

Vignola resigned his council seat in 1995, after Mayor Ed Rendell appointed him executive director of the Pennsylvania Intergovernmental Cooperation Authority (PICA).

He served in a variety of appointed positions during Rendell's gubernatorial tenure, and has subsequently returned to private business.

== Personal life ==
Philadelphia City Council
Preceded by James Tayoun	Member of the Philadelphia City Council for the 1st District; 1992–1995	Succeeded by Frank DiCicco
Political offices
Preceded by Thomas Leonard^{1}	Philadelphia City Controller; 1984–1987	Succeeded by Jonathan Saidel^{2}
Party political offices
Preceded by Cyril Wecht	Democratic nominee for U.S. Senator from Pennsylvania (Class 1); 1988	Succeeded by Harris Wofford
Notes and references
1. Immediately preceded as Acting Controller by John Smithyman; 2. Immediately succeeded as Acting Controller by John Smithyman
