= Nicholas Atkin =

Professor of modern European history at the University of Reading

Nicholas Atkin

Nicholas "Nick" James Atkin (18 September 1960 – 22 October 2009) was professor of modern European history at the University of Reading.

== Early life ==
Nicholas James Atkin was born in Gainsborough, Lincolnshire, on 18 September 1960. He was educated at Queen Elizabeth's Grammar School.

== Career ==
Atkin was appointed lecturer in history at the University of Reading in 1986, having previously taught at the University of London. He was promoted to senior lecturer in 2000 and the personal title of professor of modern European history was conferred on him in 2004.

Atkin had two main areas of research: France and French issues in the twentieth century; and French and European Catholicism. He first made his mark with a monograph on Church and Schools in Vichy France, published in 1991, and followed this up with a biography of Marshal Philippe Pétain in 1997, a popular textbook on The French at War, 1933-44 in 2001, The Forgotten French, a study of French exiles, in 2003, and a book on the French Fifth Republic in 2004.

As well as these single authored works, he was joint author of Priests Prelates and People: A history of European Catholicism (2003), as well as editor of a number of books including The Right in France (1998), Catholicism in Britain and France (1995) and Religion Society and Politics in France (1991). He later edited a book on Daily Lives of Civilians in Wartime Twentieth Century Europe. At the time of his death, he was working on a major study of Franco-British tourism in the nineteenth and twentieth century, and on a Dictionary of Modern European History.

== Death ==
Atkin died on 22 October 2009 at the age of 49.

== Selected publications ==
- Religion Society and Politics in France, 1991.
- Catholicism in Britain and France, 1995.
- The Right in France, 1998. (Editor)
- The French at War, 1933-44, 2001.
- The Forgotten French, 2003.
- Priests Prelates and People: A history of European Catholicism, 2003. (Jointly)
- Themes in modern European history, 1890-1945. Routledge, 2009. (Edited with Michael D. Biddiss)
- The Wiley-Blackwell dictionary of modern European history since 1789. Wiley-Blackwell, 2011. (Edited with Michael D. Biddiss and Frank Tallett)
