= Piran Aquarium =

Aquarium in Piran, Slovenia

- Akvarij Piran; Aquario di Pirano
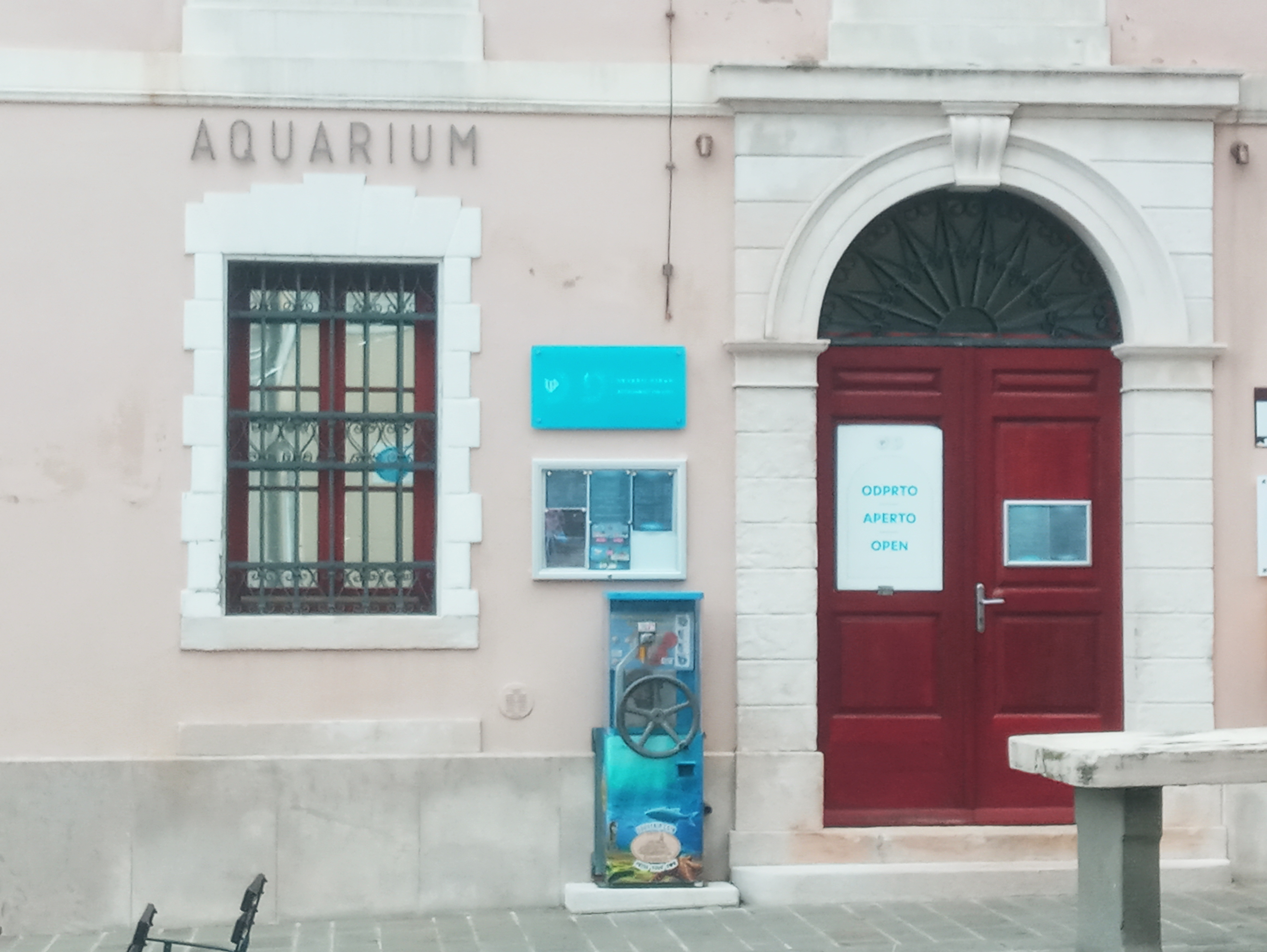
- Location: Kidričevo nabrežje 4, Piran, Slovenia
- Coordinates: 45°31′41″N 13°34′02″E
- Type: public aquarium
- Key holdings: University of Primorska
- Founder: Slovenian Coast Aquarists Association
- Manager: Manja Rogelja (strokovna vodja)
- Owner: Ministry of Education of the Republic of Slovenia
- Website: aquariumpiran.si

Piran Aquarium (Slovene: Akvarij Piran; Italian: Acquario di Pirano) is a aquarium in Piran, Slovenia, operating since 1964. It stands opposite from the maritime museum, and directly next to the inner quay of the Piran port. It is part of the science center at the University of Primorska. Since 2016 it has been run by veterinarian Manja Rogelja.

Before 1991, the aquarium was visited by up to 60,000 visitors a year, many of them Croatian schoolchildren, but then the number of visitors halved. Besides Germans and Hungarians, the majority are Slovenians, with Italian visitors being rare.

On 20 March 2007, Minister of Sport Milan Zver, Mayor of Piran Tomaž Gantar and director of Hotel Piran Ana Žerjal signed a letter of intent for the renovation. The ministry financed the renovation of the aquarium's interior. The building was demolished and rebuilt.

During the regular winter closure in 2022, the aquarium renovated the main visitor area and souvenir shop, and they began creating an interactive children's corner. The rooms were painted in marine shades.

== Postage Stamps ==
In October 2022, the aquarium released motifs for sea cauliflowers, and in April 2023, released motifs for seahorses.

== See also ==
- Maribor Aquarium and Terrarium
