= Klavdija Kutnar =

Slovene mathematician

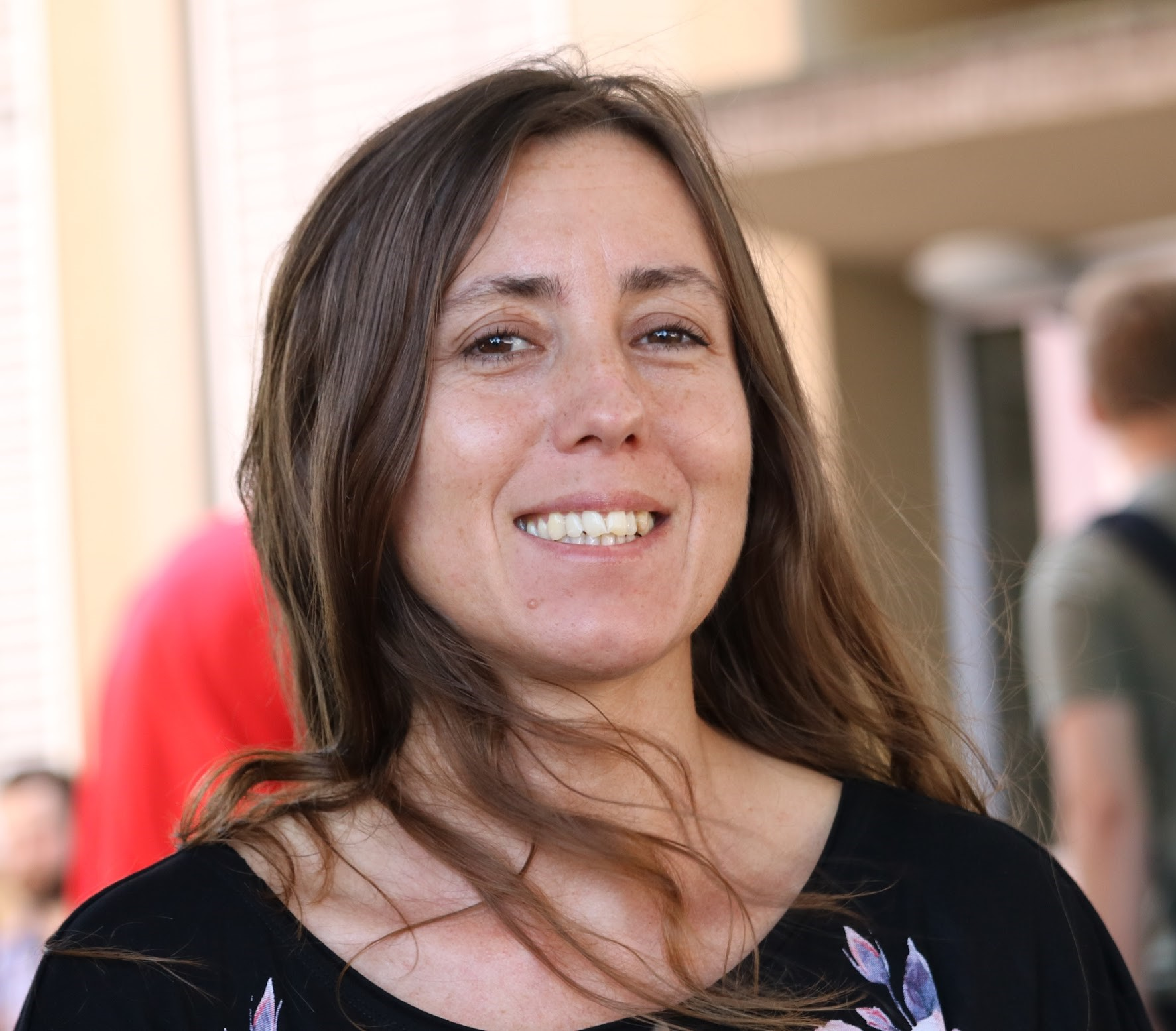
- Born: December 23, 1980 (age 45); Ljubljana, Slovenia
- Occupation: Mathematician

Academic background
- Education: University of Primorska (2008)
- Doctoral advisor: Dragan Marušič

Academic work
- Discipline: Mathematics
- Institutions: University of Primorska
- Main interests: Algebraic graph theory

Klavdija Kutnar (born December 23, 1980) is a Slovene mathematician. She received her PhD at the University of Primorska (UP) in 2008, and she currently serves as the Rector of the university.

== Biography ==
Klavdija Kutnar was born 23 December 1980, in Ljubljana, Slovenia. She graduated from the Faculty of Education of the University of Ljubljana in 2003, and in 2008 received her PhD in mathematics at the University of Primorska under the supervision of Dragan Marušič. From 2010 to 2012 she was head of the Department of Mathematics at the University of Primorska Institute Andrej Marušič (UP IAM). In 2012, she was elected dean of the University of Primorska Faculty of Mathematics, Natural Sciences and Information Technology (UP FAMNIT) and since 2015 has concurrently been assistant director of UP IAM. In 2018 she was granted the titles of Research Counsellor and Full Professor in Mathematics at the University of Primorska. In 2019 she was elected the fourth rector of the University of Primorska.

== Research ==
Kutnar's main research area is algebraic graph theory. At the beginning of her research career, she also worked in mathematical chemistry. She is noted for her contribution to the study of the structural properties of particular families of symmetric graphs and in particular, her role in developing the original method of embedding graphs on surfaces to solve special cases of the well-known Lovász conjecture: the problem of finding Hamiltonian paths and cycles in vertex-transitive and Cayley graphs. She is a member of the research program P1-0285, financed by the Slovenian Research and Innovation Agency (ARIS) and led by Dragan Marušič. In 2018, she was the first Slovenian female mathematician to obtain a basic research project financed by the ARIS (J1-9110).

== Selected publications ==
- H. H. Glover, K. Kutnar, A. Malnič and D. Marušič, Hamilton cycles in (2, odd, 3)-Cayley graphs, Proc. London Math. Soc., 104 (Issue 6) (2012), 1171–1197, doi:10.1112/plms/pdr042.
- K. Kutnar and D. Marušič, Hamilton paths and cycles in vertex-transitive graphs - current directions, Discrete Math. 309 (Issue 17) (2009), 5491–5500, doi:10.1016/j.disc.2009.02.017.
- K. Kutnar and D. Marušič, A complete classification of cubic symmetric graphs of girth 6, J. Combin. Theory Ser B 99 (Issue 1) (2009), 162–184, doi: 10.1016/j.jctb.2008.06.001.
- K. Kutnar and D. Marušič, Odd extensions of transitive groups via symmetric graphs – the cubic case, J. Combin. Theory, Ser. B 136 (2019) 170–192, doi.org/10.1016/j.jctb.2018.10.003.

== Selected conference talks ==
- K. Kutnar, Plenary talk at the G2 conference 2016, Novosibirsk, Russia On colour-preserving automorphisms of Cayley graphs

== Professional work ==
Kutnar has been a member of the editorial board of the journal Ars Mathematica Contemporanea since 2016, serving as editor-in-chief from 2018. She is also a member of the editorial boards of the Bulletin of the Institute of Combinatorics and its Applications and Algebraic Combinatorics, and managing editor of the scientific journal ADAM – The Art of Discrete and Applied Mathematics.

She was a Deputy Chair of the Organizing Committee of the 8th European Congress of Mathematics in 2021, and a member of International Advisory Committee for the International Congress of Mathematicians 2022, originally scheduled to take place in St. Petersburg, Russia.

She is a founding member and the secretary of the Slovenian Discrete and Applied Mathematics Society. Since 2017, she has been a member of the Council of the InnoRenew CoE (Center of Excellence for research and innovation in the field of renewable materials and a healthy living environment), and the leader of the investment project “Renewable Materials and Healthy Environments Research and Innovation Center of Excellence – InnoRenew CoE” at UP FAMNIT.

In 2017, Kutnar was appointed by the Minister to the Working Group to support the Peer-Counseling Project on the financing of higher education in Slovenia. She is also a member of the Council of the Republic of Slovenia for prizes and awards for outstanding achievements in science, research and development. In 2019, she became the President of the Council of the Republic of Slovenia for Higher Education.

== Personal life ==
Klavdija Kutnar has a twin sister, Andreja Kutnar, who received the 2018 Zois Award for important scientific achievements in the field of wood science, and is the director of the InnoRenew CoE.
