= Michael D. Biddiss =

English historian

Michael Denis Biddiss (born 1942) is emeritus professor of history at the University of Reading. He specialises in the history of the development of racist ideology, and the history of medicine.

== Early life ==
Michael Denis Biddiss was born in 1942. He was educated at St Joseph's Academy, Blackheath, and Queens' College, Cambridge, where he received a first in Part II of the historical tripos in 1964.

== Career ==
Biddiss was formerly a fellow of Downing College, Cambridge. He has been professor of history at the University of Reading since 1979 (emeritus since 2004), and was dean of letters and social sciences from 1982 to 1985. He was president of the Historical Association from 1991 to 1994. He specialises in the history of the development of racist ideology.

== Selected publications ==
- The age of the masses: Ideas and society in Europe since 1870. Penguin, 1977. ISBN 0140219870
- Father of racist ideology: The social and political thought of Count Gobineau. Weybright & Talley, New York, 1970. ISBN 0297000853
- Gobineau: Selected political writings. Jonathan Cape, London, 1970. (Editor and introduction) (Roots of the Right series) ISBN 0224617273
- Thatcherism: Personality and politics. Macmillan, Basingstoke, 1987. (Edited with Kenneth R. Minogue) ISBN 0333447247
- Images of race. Leicester University Press, Leicester, 1979. (Editor) ISBN 0718550609
- The uses and abuses of antiquity. Peter Lang, 1999. (Editor with Maria Wyke) ISBN 3906761649
- Themes in modern European history, 1890–1945. Routledge, 2009. (Edited with Nicholas Atkin)
- The Wiley-Blackwell dictionary of modern European history since 1789. Wiley-Blackwell, 2011. (Edited with Nicholas Atkin and Frank Tallett)
