= Turning state's evidence =

Legal term for one who testifies as a witness for the state

A criminal turns state's evidence by admitting guilt and testifying as a witness for the state against their associate(s) or accomplice(s), often in exchange for leniency in sentencing or immunity from prosecution. The testimony of a witness who testifies against co-conspirator(s) may be important evidence.

According to a 2008 United Nations Office on Drugs and Crime document, persons who turn state's evidence "are known by a variety of names, including cooperating witnesses, crown witnesses, snitches, witness collaborators, justice collaborators, state witnesses, 'supergrasses', macarons and pentiti (Italian for 'those who have repented')."

== United Kingdom ==
In the United Kingdom and the Commonwealth realms, the term is to turn Queen's or King's evidence, depending on the sex of the reigning monarch. The term "turning approver" or "turn king's approver" was also historically used, especially in Ireland; an approver "not only admitted his own guilt to a crime but also incriminated his accomplices both past and present" in exchange for avoiding a death sentence (and obtaining a lesser penalty, such as life imprisonment or abjuration of the realm) or improving prison conditions. It has its origins in the 16th century, and allowed a person to become a crown witness and avoid pleading guilty. Even at this early stage, the courts saw crown witness testimony as less reliable than other evidence, because it was encouraged in return for better treatment before the law. In 1751, regulations were introduced, stipulating that crown witness testimony should be corroborated with independent, third-party evidence.

Crown witnesses known as supergrasses were used during the Northern Ireland conflict. In the 1980s, about 30 members of paramilitary groups (both loyalist and republican) gave the authorities evidence against their former comrades in exchange for a more lenient sentence (or immunity from prosecution), as well as a new identity to protect them from retribution. Supergrass testimony was used, for example, in trials against IRA members.

== United States ==
American courts adopted English common-law practices relating to witnesses turning state's evidence, "and expanded them to include leniency agreements as well as immunity agreements."

In American parlance, a defendant who agrees to cooperate with prosecutors and give information against co-conspirators (often those with greater culpability) is also said to flip. Witnesses who have turned state's evidence have been important in organized crime cases in the United States, such as those against the American Mafia. The first mafiosi who turned state's evidence, such as Joseph Valachi and Jimmy Fratianno, did so in response to threats on their life from Mafia associates; later cooperators were motivated to cooperate in order to avoid heavy sentences, such as those provided for under the RICO Act. Some who turned state's evidence were permitted to participate in the Witness Security Program (WITSEC). Among the highest-ranking Mafia members to turn state's evidence was Salvatore Gravano ("Sammy the Bull"), an underboss of the Gambino crime family who pleaded guilty to 19 murders and agreed to testify against family boss John Gotti; as a result, Gravano was sentenced to 5 years and Gotti was sentenced to life imprisonment in 1992. Joseph Massino was also the first boss of one of the Five Families in New York City to turn state's evidence.

== Germany ==
A crown witness–style system has operated in Germany since the RAF trials in the 1970s. The Justice Minister at that time, Diether Posser, wanted to enable witnesses to testify in return for a lenient sentence if there was little chance of successfully prosecuting a criminal. Four attempts were made to introduce the system to anti-terror legislation, but it was not included in the 1976 legislation. Additionally, Germany lacked a witness protection program such as that found in the United States; Ulrich Schmücker was murdered after he informed on his former associates in the 2 June Movement. Another crown witness, Karl-Heinz Ruhland, recanted his testimony against the Baader–Meinhof Group, as he initially did not receive protection from the state. The treatment crown witnesses received at this time was viewed as illegal by the media, but necessary by the prosecution. In 1981, Germany introduced a "small crown witness rule" in drug-related trials which permitted a lower sentence for witnesses who turned state's evidence. In 1989, during the government of Helmut Kohl, Germany introduced a law effectively called the "crown witness rule" which enabled witnesses in terror-related cases to turn state's evidence. Initially only valid until 1992, it was extended several times until it was abolished in 1999. A law adopted in 2000 lowered the sentence of a witness who came to an agreement with the prosecution in trials concerning money laundering, but it was not called a crown witness rule. In 2009 a new crown witness rule came into force and since then, witnesses in a wider range of cases have been allowed to become crown witnesses.

== Prisoner's dilemma ==
The incentives to turn state's evidence, or not to do so, are explored in the famous prisoner's dilemma, created by Merrill Flood and Melvin Dresher.

== See also ==
- Informant
- Plea bargain
- Pentito, the equivalent term in Italy in the Mafia and terrorism contexts
