= Leland Beloff =

American politician and convicted criminal

Leland "Lee" Beloff

Member of the Philadelphia City Council from the 1st District
- In office May 3, 1984 – August 4, 1987
- Preceded by: James Tayoun
- Succeeded by: James Tayoun

Member of the Pennsylvania House of Representatives from the 184th district
- In office January 4, 1977 – May 3, 1984
- Preceded by: Michael Ozzie Myers
- Succeeded by: Joseph Howlett
- In office January 7, 1969 – November 30, 1970
- Preceded by: District Created
- Succeeded by: Michael Ozzie Myers

Personal details
- Born: April 17, 1942 (age 84) Philadelphia, Pennsylvania, US
- Party: Republican (when a state representative); Democrat (when a city councilman)
- Occupation: Boxer, Philadelphia City Council

Leland M. Beloff (born April 17, 1942) is a former American politician and convicted criminal. Mob boss Nicky Scarfo, who himself had been an amateur boxer followed the careers of young fighters from South Philadelphia, including Beloff. He was a Jewish Democratic member of the Pennsylvania House of Representatives and the Philadelphia City Council, who resigned from office after being convicted in Federal court on extortion charges. His district was Old City, Philadelphia. The City Council would not approve any property development without consent of the district councilman. This gave Beloff power over the developers that would be given permits to build. In 1985 Beloff backed a construction project for an apartment building in return for a luxury apartment in Old City and then moved his mistress into the apartment that was rent-free. It was the failed extortion attempt by Lee Beloff, Nick Caramandi and Thomas DelGiorno that led to Caramandi deciding to turn as a cooperating witness against Scarfo after hearing that Scarfo put a murder contract on him.

Beloff was sentenced to 10 years in prison, along with Philadelphia Mob boss Nicodemo Scarfo, for extorting money from Center City developer Willard Rouse. In 1998, he and his wife were convicted on voter fraud charges. He received a three-year sentence served concurrently with his earlier sentence. He was paroled in 1993 and went on to become Democratic ward chairperson. He was arrested in 2011 on disorderly conduct but the charges were later dropped.

Beloff has been a resident of Longport, New Jersey, and Gladwyne, Pennsylvania.
