= Thomas W. Tucker =

American mathematician

Thomas William Tucker (born July 15, 1945) is a retired American mathematician, a Charles Hetherington Professor of Mathematics, Emeritus, at Colgate University, and an expert in the area of topological graph theory.

Tucker did his undergraduate studies at Harvard University, graduating in 1967, and obtained his Ph.D. from Dartmouth College in 1971, under the supervision of Edward Martin Brown.

Tucker's father, Albert W. Tucker, was also a professional mathematician, and his brother, Alan Tucker, and son, Thomas J. Tucker, are also professional mathematicians.
