= Albert W. Tucker =

Canadian mathematician (1905–1995)

- Born: Albert William Tucker; 28 November 1905; Oshawa, Ontario, Canada
- Died: 25 January 1995 (aged 89); Hightstown, New Jersey, U.S.
- Education: University of Toronto (BA, MA); Princeton University (PhD)
- Known for: Tucker's lemma Karush–Kuhn–Tucker conditions Prisoner's dilemma Combinatorial linear algebra
- Awards: John von Neumann Theory Prize (1980)
- Scientific career
- Fields: Mathematician: Combinatorial topology Optimization
- Workplaces: Princeton University
- Thesis: An Abstract Approach to Manifolds (1932)
- Doctoral advisor: Solomon Lefschetz
- Doctoral students: David Gale; John R. Isbell; Marvin Minsky; John Forbes Nash; Torrence Parsons; Lloyd Shapley

Albert William Tucker (28 November 1905 – 25 January 1995) was a Canadian mathematician who made important contributions in topology, game theory, and non-linear programming.

== Early life and education ==
Albert Tucker was born in Oshawa, Ontario, Canada, and earned his B.A. at the University of Toronto in 1928 and his M.A. at the same institution in 1929. In 1932, he earned his Ph.D. at Princeton University under the supervision of Solomon Lefschetz, with a dissertation entitled An Abstract Approach to Manifolds. In 1932–33 he was a National Research Fellow at Cambridge, Harvard, and then University of Chicago.

== Career ==
Tucker then returned to Princeton to join the faculty in 1933, where he stayed until 1974. He chaired the mathematics department for about twenty years, one of the longest tenures. His extensive relationships within the field made him a great source for oral histories of the mathematics community.

In 1950, Albert Tucker gave the name and interpretation "prisoner's dilemma" to Merrill M. Flood and Melvin Dresher's model of cooperation and conflict, resulting in the most well-known game theoretic paradox. He is also well known for the Karush–Kuhn–Tucker conditions, a basic result in non-linear programming, which was published in conference proceedings, rather than in a journal.

In the 1960s, he was heavily involved in mathematics education, as chair of the AP Calculus committee for the College Board (1960–1963), through work with the Committee on the Undergraduate Program in Mathematics (CUPM) of the MAA (he was president of the MAA in 1961–1962), and through many NSF summer workshops for high school and college teachers. George B. Thomas Jr. acknowledged Tucker's contribution of many exercises to Thomas's classic textbook, Calculus and Analytic Geometry.

In the early 1980s, Tucker recruited Princeton history professor Charles Coulston Gillispie to help him set up an oral history project to preserve stories about the Princeton mathematical community in the 1930s. With funding from the Sloan Foundation, this project later expanded its scope. Among those who shared their memories of such figures as Einstein, von Neumann, and Gödel were computer pioneer Herman Goldstine and Nobel laureates John Bardeen and Eugene Wigner.

== Students and legacy ==
Tucker's Ph.D. students include Michel Balinski, David Gale, Alan J. Goldman, John Isbell, Stephen Maurer, Turing Award winner Marvin Minsky, Nobel Prize winner John Nash, Torrence Parsons, Nobel Prize winner Lloyd Shapley, Robert Singleton, and Marjorie Stein. Tucker advised and collaborated with Harold W. Kuhn on a number of papers and mathematical models.

Tucker noticed the leadership ability and talent of a young mathematics graduate student named John G. Kemeny, whose hiring Tucker suggested to Dartmouth College. Following Tucker's advice, Dartmouth recruited Kemeny, who became Chair of the Mathematics Department and later College President. Years later, Dartmouth College recognized Albert Tucker with an honorary degree.

Tucker died in Hightstown, N.J. in 1995 at age 89. His sons, Alan Tucker and Thomas W. Tucker, and his grandson Thomas J. Tucker are all professional mathematicians.

=== Tucker Prize ===
At each (triennial) International Symposium of the Mathematical Optimization Society (MOS) the Tucker Prize, in honour of A. W. Tucker, is given for outstanding thesis in the area of discrete mathematics.

== Works ==
- with H. W. Kuhn (eds.): Contributions to the theory of games, Annals of Mathematics Studies 1950
- with H. W. Kuhn (eds.): Linear inequalities and related systems, Annals of Mathematics Studies 1956
- with Allan Gewirtz, Harry Sitomer: Constructive linear algebra, Englewood Cliffs 1974
- with Evar Nering: Linear Programs and related problems, Academic Press 1993

Academic offices
Preceded by Emil Artin	Dod Professor of Mathematics at Princeton University; 1954–1974	Succeeded by Elias Stein
