= Elizabeth Fiedler =

American politician

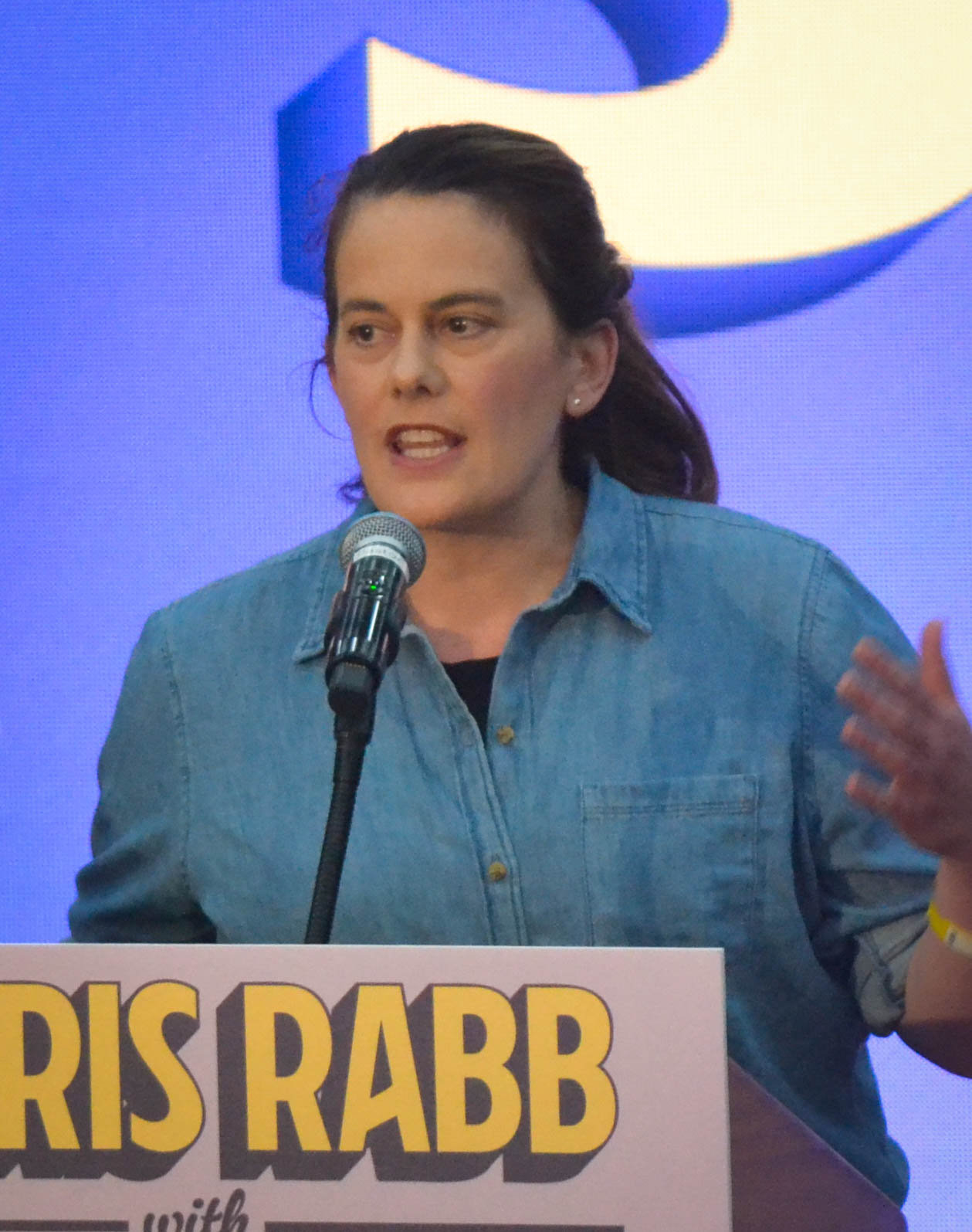
- Fiedler in 2026

Member of the Pennsylvania House of Representatives from the 184th district
- Incumbent
- Assumed office January 3, 2019
- Preceded by: William F. Keller

Personal details
- Born: July 18, 1980 (age 46) Bloomsburg, Pennsylvania, U.S.
- Party: Democratic
- Other political affiliations: Democratic Socialists of America
- Education: Bucknell University

Elizabeth A. Fiedler (born July 18, 1980) is an American politician who serves as a Democratic representative for the 184th district of the Pennsylvania House of Representatives.

== Early life and career ==
Fiedler was born on July 18, 1980, in New York and as a young child moved to Bloomsburg, Pennsylvania. Her parents were a middle school teacher and a high school teacher. She attended Bloomsburg public schools from kindergarten through her school graduation. Fiedler received a bachelor's degree in international relations at Bucknell University in 2002, and then worked at various restaurants in Philadelphia for six years. In 2008, she began working as a public radio reporter for WHYY, the NPR affiliate in Philadelphia. Fiedler was also President of the Board of Governors of the Pen & Pencil Club, a press club, in 2014.

== Pennsylvania House of Representatives ==
Fiedler's campaign platform focused on Medicare for All, increased public education funding, and environmental regulations on oil and gas companies. She won the nomination with almost 51% of the vote in a 4-way race in the 2018 Democratic primary, and did not face a Republican challenger in the general election. Fiedler has been endorsed by numerous labor unions including the Philadelphia Federation of Teachers, AFSCME, UNITE HERE, Teamsters BMWED, PASNAP, various environmentalist groups, the Pennsylvania Working Families Party, and the Democratic Socialists of America.

== Electoral history ==
2018 Pennsylvania State Representative election for the 184th district, Democratic primary
| Party | Candidate | Votes | % |
|---|---|---|---|
| Democratic | Elizabeth Fiedler | 4,743 | 50.89% |
| Democratic | Jonathan Rowan | 3,444 | 36.95% |
| Democratic | Nicholas DiDonato Jr. | 447 | 4.8% |
| Democratic | Thomas Wyatt | 687 | 7.37% |
| Total votes | | 9,321 | 100% |

2018 Pennsylvania State Representative election for the 184th district
| Party | Candidate | Votes | % | ±% |
|---|---|---|---|---|
| Democratic | Elizabeth Fiedler | 17,441 | 100% | 0 |
| Total votes | | 17,441 | 100% | N/A |
| Democratic hold | | | | |

2020 Pennsylvania State Representative election for the 184th district, Democratic primary
| Party | Candidate | Votes | % |
|---|---|---|---|
| Democratic | Elizabeth Fiedler (incumbent) | 10,446 | 100% |
| Total votes | | 10,446 | 100% |

2020 Pennsylvania State Representative election for the 184th district
| Party | Candidate | Votes | % | ±% |
|---|---|---|---|---|
| Democratic | Elizabeth Fiedler (incumbent) | 20,243 | 71.07% | −28.93 |
| Republican | Louis T. Menna IV | 8,240 | 28.93% | N/A |
| Total votes | | 28,483 | 100% | N/A |
| Democratic hold | | | | |

2022 Pennsylvania State Representative election for the 184th district, Democratic primary
| Party | Candidate | Votes | % | ±% |
|---|---|---|---|---|
| Democratic | Elizabeth Fiedler (incumbent) | 7,876 | 79.1% | −28.05 |
| Democratic | Michael Giangiordano | 2,075 | 20.9% | N/A |
| Total votes | | 9,951 | 100% | |

== See also ==
- List of Democratic Socialists of America who have held office in the United States
