= James Tayoun =

American politician

James J. Tayoun

Member of the Philadelphia City Council from the 1st District
- In office January 4, 1988 – May 17, 1991
- Preceded by: Leland Beloff
- Succeeded by: Joe Vignola
- In office January 5, 1976 – January 27, 1984
- Preceded by: Isadore Bellis
- Succeeded by: Leland Beloff

Member of the Pennsylvania House of Representatives from the 183rd district
- In office January 7, 1969 – November 30, 1970
- Preceded by: District Created
- Succeeded by: Adriano Mastrangelo

Personal details
- Born: March 27, 1930 Philadelphia, Pennsylvania
- Died: November 1, 2017 (aged 87) Philadelphia, Pennsylvania
- Party: Democratic
- Education: Temple University

James Joseph Tayoun (March 27, 1930 – November 1, 2017) was a Democratic member of Philadelphia City Council and of the Pennsylvania House of Representatives.

He served non-consecutive terms representing District 1 on Philadelphia City Council. He resigned from his first term in 1984 to run for a seat in the First Congressional District of Pennsylvania, challenging incumbent Thomas Foglietta.

He resigned from his second term after pleading guilty to racketeering, mail fraud, tax evasion and obstruction of justice charges. He spent 40 months in prison. He is the 7th council member to be indicted since 1972.

He was also editor, publisher, and photographer for the Public Record, a weekly newspaper.
