= Joseph Howlett =

American politician

Member of the Pennsylvania House of Representatives from the 184th district
- In office January 1, 1985 – November 30, 1990
- Preceded by: Leland Beloff
- Succeeded by: Connie McHugh

Personal details
- Born: August 4, 1943 (age 82) Philadelphia, Pennsylvania, United States
- Died: 11/18/04 Philadelphia, Pennsylvania
- Party: Democratic

Joseph Howlett (August 4, 1943 – November 18, 2004) is a former Democratic member of the Pennsylvania House of Representatives.
