= Michael Myers (Pennsylvania politician) =

American politician (born 1943)

Ozzie Myers
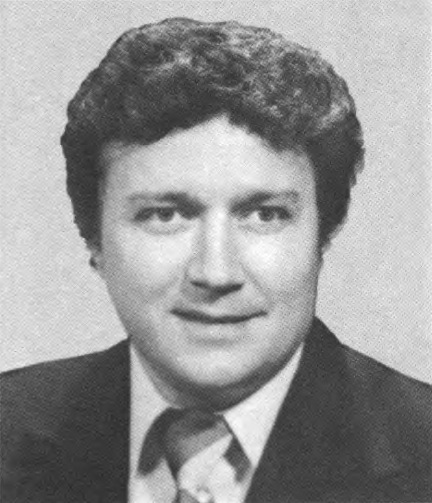
- Official portrait, 1977

Member of the U.S. House of Representatives from Pennsylvania's 1st district
- In office November 2, 1976 – October 2, 1980
- Preceded by: William A. Barrett
- Succeeded by: Thomas M. Foglietta

Member of the Pennsylvania House of Representatives from the 184th district
- In office January 5, 1971 – November 2, 1976
- Preceded by: Leland Beloff
- Succeeded by: Leland Beloff

Personal details
- Born: Michael Joseph Myers; May 4, 1943 (age 83) Philadelphia, Pennsylvania, U.S.
- Party: Democratic

Michael Joseph "Ozzie" Myers (born May 4, 1943) is an American politician who served in the United States House of Representatives from 1976 to 1980. A member of the Democratic Party, Myers became involved in the Abscam scandal during his tenure in Congress and was expelled from the House after being caught taking bribes in a sting operation by the Federal Bureau of Investigation. He spent three years in federal prison.

== Early life ==
Myers was born on May 4, 1943, in Philadelphia, the son of Margaret (Sullivan) and Mark Myers. In 1963, Myers was arrested for burglary but was later acquitted.

== Political career ==
=== Pennsylvania House of Representatives ===
In December 1970, a cousin of Myers named Michael Joseph Sullivan (who later served as an election judge while incarcerated), shot and killed a construction worker during a union dispute. It was revealed in 1974 by The Philadelphia Inquirer that Myers was in possession of the gun used in the shooting while he himself was lobbying against Philadelphia's gun registration law. In August 1975, the Pennsylvania House of Representatives voted 176–1 in favor of removing representative Leonard Sweeney after he was sentenced to three years in prison for his involvement in a phony accident organization with Myers as the only nay.

In 1975, the state legislature was voting on an appropriations bill to allocate $23 million for Philadelphia's United States Bicentennial celebrations, but was defeated on October 15. The bill was brought up for another vote by Myers who was told by Appropriations Committee chairman Stephen Wojdak to send it back to the Committee, but Myers stated that the bill had enough support to pass and put it up for a vote. The bill was defeated with 107–88 voting to reject it.

=== U.S. House of Representatives ===
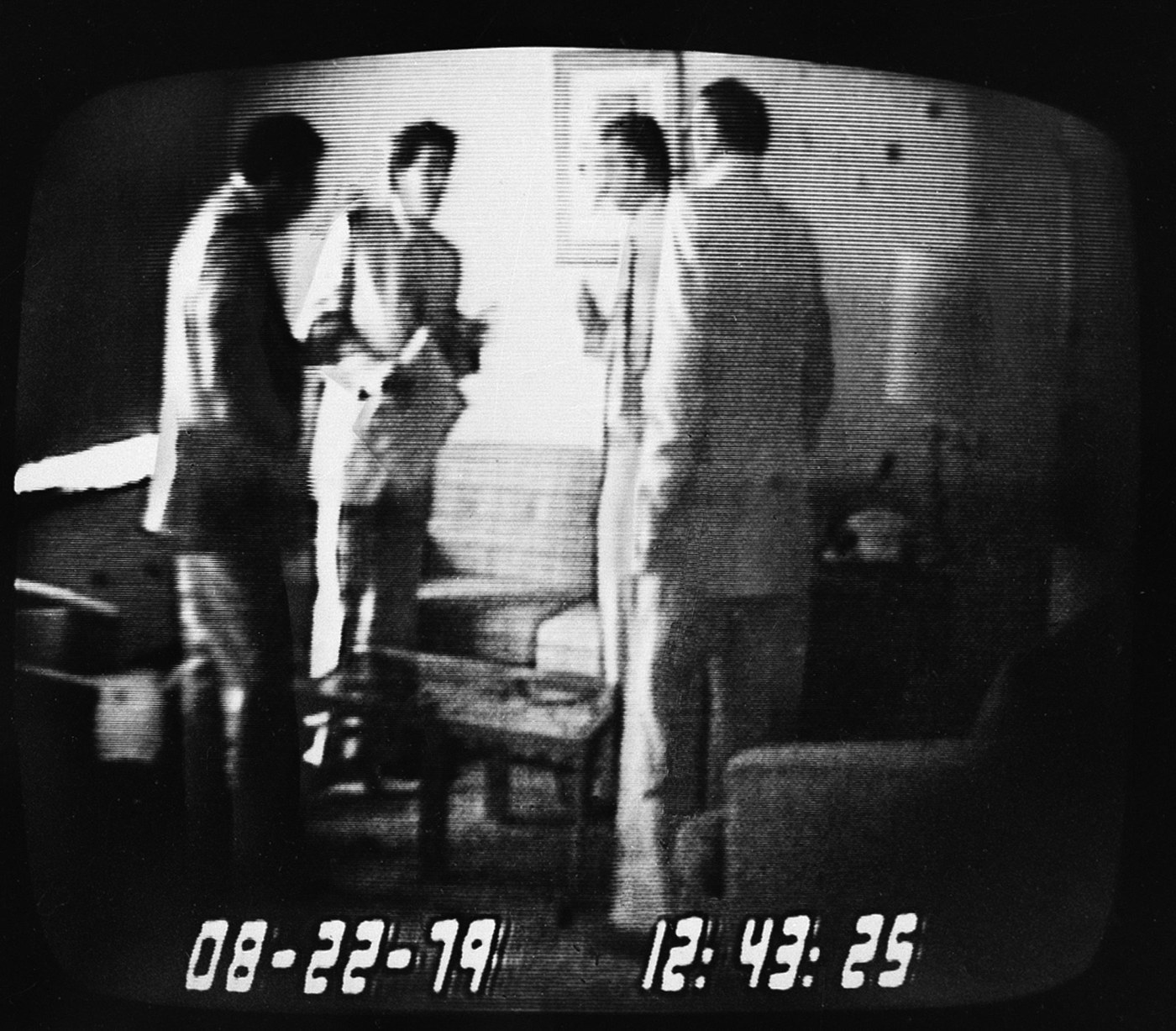
U.S. Representative Michael Myers, second from left, holds an envelope containing $50,000 that he just received from undercover FBI Agent Anthony Amoroso.

On July 2, 1976, Myers was given the Democratic nomination to run in the special election to fill the first congressional district seat following William A. Barrett's death. In 1979, representative Ronald M. Mottl proposed a constitutional amendment that would ban forced busing and Myers supported the amendment.

In 1979, Myers punched and kicked a security guard and a 19-year-old female cashier in an elevator leading from the rooftop lounge of a Quality Inn motel in Arlington, Virginia. Myers became combative after they told him to turn down the music at a party he was having in the motel, shouting, "I'm a congressman: we don't have to be quiet." He was subsequently charged with assault and battery, and eventually pleaded no contest to a charge of disorderly conduct three months later. He received a six-month suspended sentence.

Myers was involved in the Abscam scandal. He was videotaped accepting a bribe of $50,000 from undercover Federal Bureau of Investigation agents on August 22, 1979. On that tape, Myers is recorded saying that "money talks in this business and bullshit walks." Myers was expelled from the U.S. House of Representatives on October 2, 1980, by a vote of 376–30, becoming the first member of the House to be expelled since the Civil War. Myers was defeated by independent politician Thomas M. Foglietta in the 1980 election. Myers was then convicted of bribery and conspiracy and sentenced to three years in prison in 1981.

== Later life ==
After release, Myers started his own political consulting firm.

Myers was accused of conspiring to violate voting rights by fraudulently stuffing the ballot boxes for Democratic candidates in the 2014, 2015, 2016, 2017, and 2018 elections. He was charged on July 21, 2020, with bribery of an election official, falsification of records, voting more than once in federal elections, and obstruction of justice.

The charges included conspiring with and bribing Domenick J. Demuro, the former judge of elections for the 39th ward, 36th division. Demuro pleaded guilty in May 2020 in federal court in Philadelphia that he was responsible for overseeing the entire election process and all voter activities of his division in accordance with federal and state election laws. On June 6, 2022, Myers pled guilty to those new charges. On September 27, 2022, he was sentenced to 2.5 years in federal prison by judge Paul S. Diamond.

== Electoral history ==
1976 Pennsylvania's 1st congressional district special election
Party	Candidate	Votes	%	±%
Democratic	Michael Myers	118,406	74.39%	−1.44%
Republican	Samuel N. Fanelli	40,757	25.61%	+2.33%
Total votes		159,163	100.00%	

1976 Pennsylvania's 1st congressional district election
Party	Candidate	Votes	%	±%
Democratic	Michael Myers (incumbent)	117,087	73.55%	−0.84%
Republican	Samuel N. Fanelli	40,191	25.25%	−0.36%
Socialist Workers	Clare Fraenzl	1,341	0.84%	+0.84%
U.S. Labor	Henry D. Moss	586	0.37%	+0.37%
Total votes		159,205	100.00%	

1978 Pennsylvania's 1st congressional district election
Party	Candidate	Votes	%	±%
Democratic	Michael Myers (incumbent)	104,412	71.55%	−2.83%
Republican	Samuel N. Fanelli	37,913	26.12%	+0.87%
Libertarian	John C. Smith	2,837	1.95%	N/A
Total votes		145,162	100.00%	

1980 Pennsylvania's 1st congressional district election
Party	Candidate	Votes	%	±%
Independent Democrat	Thomas M. Foglietta	58,737	37.79%	N/A
Democratic	Michael Myers (Note: Myers, who was the incumbent at the beginning of the campaign, was expelled from the House on October 2nd, 1980 as a result of his involvement in the Abscam scandal.)	52,956	34.07%	−37.48%
Republican	Robert R. Burke	37,893	24.38%	−1.74%
Libertarian	Geoffrey Steinberg	3,161	2.03%	+0.08%
Consumer Party (United States)	Shaheed Abdul-Haqq	2,704	1.74%	N/A
Total votes		155,451	100.00%	

== See also ==
- List of American federal politicians convicted of crimes
- List of federal political scandals in the United States
- List of United States representatives expelled, censured, or reprimanded

== Notes ==
U.S. House of Representatives
Preceded by William A. Barrett	Member of the U.S. House of Representatives from Pennsylvania's 1st congressional district 1976–1980	Succeeded by Thomas M. Foglietta
U.S. order of precedence (ceremonial)
Preceded by Debbie Lesko as Former U.S. Representative	Order of precedence of the United States as Former U.S. Representative	Succeeded by Charles F. Dougherty as Former U.S. Representative
