= Maribor Aquarium and Terrarium =

Aquarium-Terrarium in Maribor, Slovenia

Coordinates: 46°33′53″N 15°38′58″E

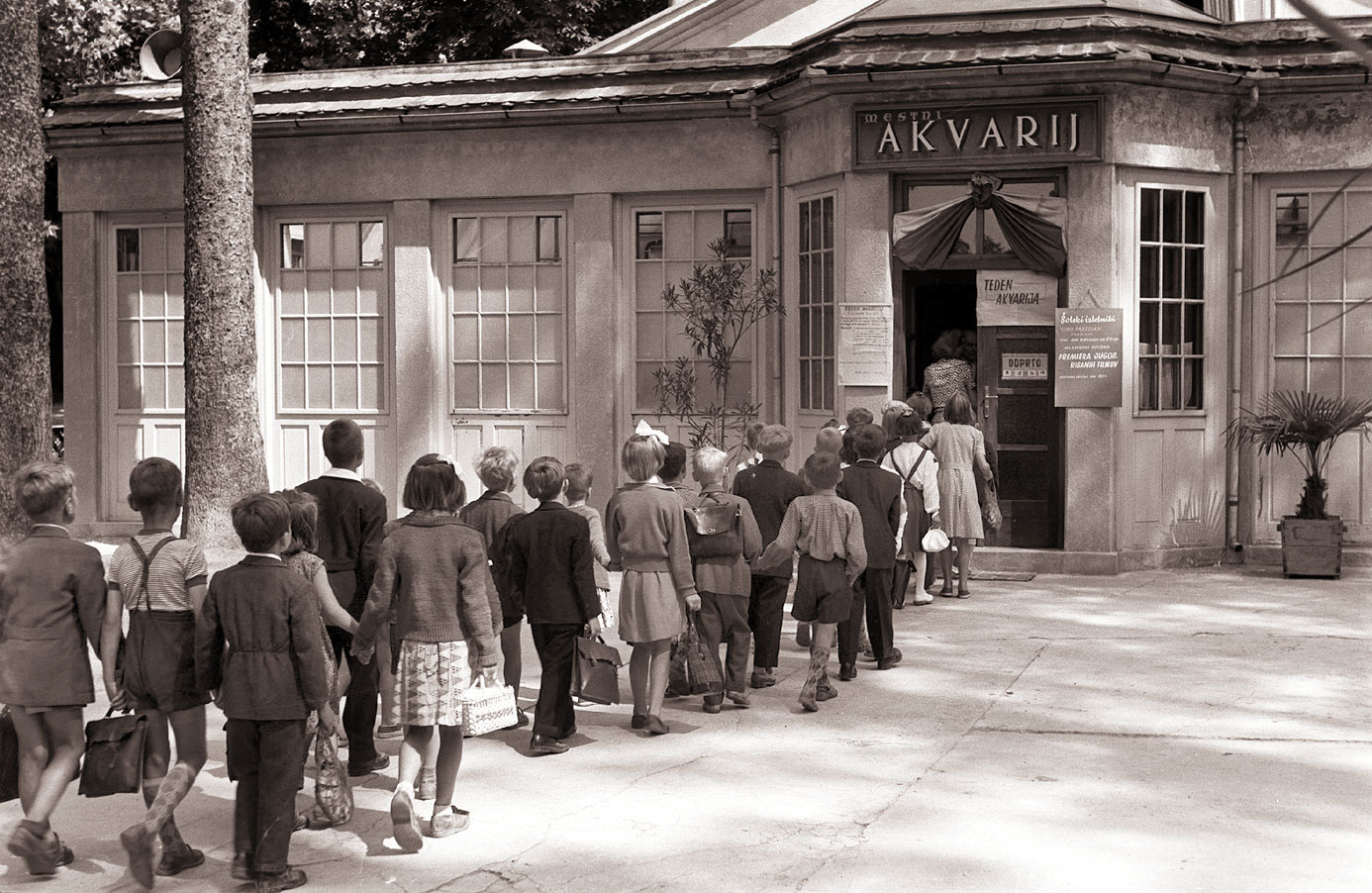
Aquarium-Terrarium Maribor in 1958

Aquarium-Terrarium Maribor (Slovene: Akvarij–terarij Maribor) is an aquarium and terarrium in Maribor, Slovenia. It began operations in 1953. During the interwar period, the building housed the Park Café.

In the terrarium, there are more than 100 different reptiles, amphibians and insects.

The owner of the aquarium-terrarium is the urban municipality of Maribor, managed by the company Snaga. The acting head of professional and organizational tasks is Branko Kolar.

== See also ==
- Piran Aquarium

== Books ==
- Zagoršćak, Vesna (2013). Akvarij - terarij Maribor: 60 let. Nigrad. ISBN 978-961-281-164-8.
