= The Public Record (newspaper) =

Newspaper in Philadelphia, US

- The paper's November 11, 2008 front page
- Type: Weekly newspaper
- Format: Tabloid
- Owner: The Public Record
- Publisher: James Tayoun, Sr.
- Editor-in-chief: James Tayoun, Sr.
- Founded: 1999
- Language: English
- Headquarters: 1323 South Broad Street; Philadelphia PA 19147; United States
- Price: free by mail and street boxes
- ISSN: 1938-8551
- Website: phillyrecord.com

The Public Record is a free weekly tabloid newspaper, published in Philadelphia, Pennsylvania since 1999. In addition to news coverage, The Public Record publishes opinion essays and editorial commentary. The editorial matter is local and state politics, labor unions, schools and community organization news. The advertising matter is by labor unions, businesses, candidates for public office, elected officials, and official city notices such as legal notices by the courts, election notices and Philadelphia Sheriff's sales.

== History ==
The Public Record began publication in September 1999 as a semi-monthly, and changed to a weekly in April, 2000.

The publisher of the Public Record was James Tayoun, Sr. who was a former City Councilman in Philadelphia and State Representative in Harrisburg who resigned from office after pleading guilty to racketeering, mail-fraud, tax- evasion and obstruction-of-justice.

In 2010, the Public Record announced a new sister publication, "The South Philadelphia Public Record."

Frank Talent wrote under a pseudonym for the publication as gossip columnist "The Snooper" until his death in 2011.

== See also ==
- List of newspapers in Pennsylvania
