= Torrence Parsons =

American mathematician

- Born: Torrence Douglas Parsons; March 7, 1941; Pennsylvania, U.S.
- Died: April 2, 1987 (aged 46); Chico, California, U.S.
- Education: Princeton University (PhD)
- Known for: introducing a graph-theoretic view of pursuit–evasion problems
- Scientific career
- Fields: Mathematician
- Doctoral advisor: Albert W. Tucker
- Doctoral students: Tomaž Pisanski

Torrence Douglas Parsons (March 7, 1941 – April 2, 1987) was an American mathematician known for his study of graph theory.

== Mathematics ==
Parsons worked mainly in graph theory, and is known for introducing a graph-theoretic view of pursuit–evasion problems. He obtained his Ph.D. from Princeton University in 1966 under the supervision of Albert W. Tucker. Parsons traveled often for his work, especially to Former Yugoslavia. In 1981, Parsons traveled to University of Ljubljana to be the thesis advisor for Tomaž Pisanski's thesis defense. In 1985, he gave a lecture in Dubrovnik.

== Personal life and death ==
Parsons died on April 2, 1987, at the age of 46 in Chico, California. He had been set to host a lecture at the Australian Mathematical Society in May 1987. The cause of death was ventricular fibrillation, following Parsons running a marathon. Parsons regularly ran marathons. Following Parsons' death, the University of Chico established a memorial fund in his name.

Parsons was married and had two children, a pair of twins named Craig and Russell.
