= 1988 United States Senate election in Pennsylvania =

- November 8, 1988
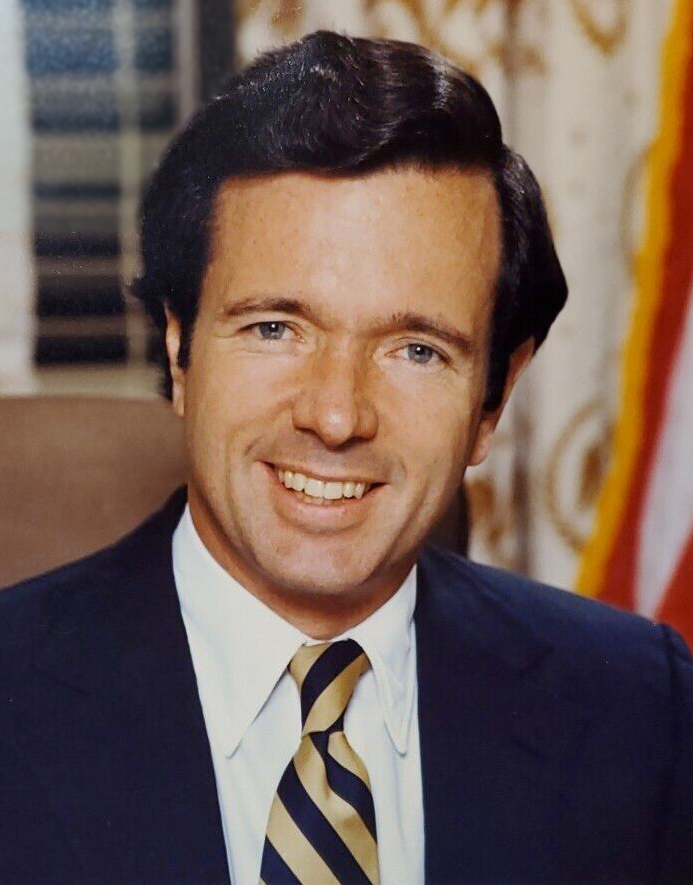

Nominee	John Heinz	Joseph Vignola
Party	Republican	Democratic
Popular vote	2,901,715	1,416,764
Percentage	66.45%	32.45%
- County results Heinz: 50–60% 60–70% 70–80% 80–90% Vignola: 70–80%
U.S. senator before election
John Heinz
Republican
Elected U.S. Senator
John Heinz
Republican

The 1988 United States Senate election in Pennsylvania was held on November 8, 1988. Incumbent Republican U.S. Senator John Heinz successfully sought re-election to another term, defeating Democratic nominee Joe Vignola.

== General election ==
=== Candidates ===
- Sam Blancato (New Alliance)
- Samuel Cross (Populist)
- Henry E. Haller II (Libertarian)
- H. John Heinz III, incumbent U.S. Senator (Republican)
- Darcy Richardson (Consumer)
- Joe Vignola, Philadelphia City Controller (Democratic)

=== Campaign ===
Joe Vignola was not expected by Democratic Party leaders to have a substantial chance at defeating the popular incumbent John Heinz, even predicting that Vignola would become "Heinz's 58th variety," referring to an advertising slogan of the H. J. Heinz Company. Heinz, knowing this, ran a low-profile re-election campaign and was safely ahead in polling.

Vignola traveled across Pennsylvania promoting an increase in domestic spending, including education and healthcare, while decreasing the defense budget to compensate. Vignola ran a positive campaign, in contrast with Cyril Wecht six years previously, although many Democratic ward leaders and committee members had given up on the campaign and had stopped campaigning for Vignola.

=== Results ===
Heinz easily defeated Vignola to win the election and another term in the Senate, carrying every Pennsylvania county except Philadelphia, Vignola's hometown, and by a comfortable 1.49 million vote margin. Heinz performed well in suburban areas, as well as the central, southwestern and northeastern portions of the state.

Outside of Philadelphia, Vignola's best county-wide showing was in Fayette County, where he won 45% of the vote; his poorest county-wide performance was in Snyder County, where he won 12% of the vote.

Although Heinz's landslide victory was largely expected among Democratic leaders, Heinz won by a wide margin despite the Democrats' 551,000-voter registration advantage statewide.

General election results
Party	Candidate	Votes	%	±%
Republican	H. John Heinz III (Incumbent)	2,901,715	66.45%	+7.17%
Democratic	Joseph Vignola	1,416,764	32.45%	−6.75%
Consumer	Darcy Richardson	25,273	0.58%	+0.12%
Libertarian	Henry E. Haller II	11,822	0.27%	−0.26%
Populist	Samuel Cross	6,455	0.15%	+0.15%
New Alliance	Sam Blancato	4,569	0.11%	+0.11%
Total votes		4,366,598	100%	
Majority		1,484,951	34.00%	+13.92%
Republican hold				

== Aftermath ==
Heinz died in an airplane crash on April 4, 1991, in Lower Merion Township, Pennsylvania.

Democrat Harris Wofford was appointed on May 8 to fill the vacancy caused by Heinz's death, and subsequently won a special election in November 1991. In the 1994 election, however, Wofford was defeated by Republican Rick Santorum.

== See also ==
- 1988 United States Senate elections
