= William F. Keller =

American politician

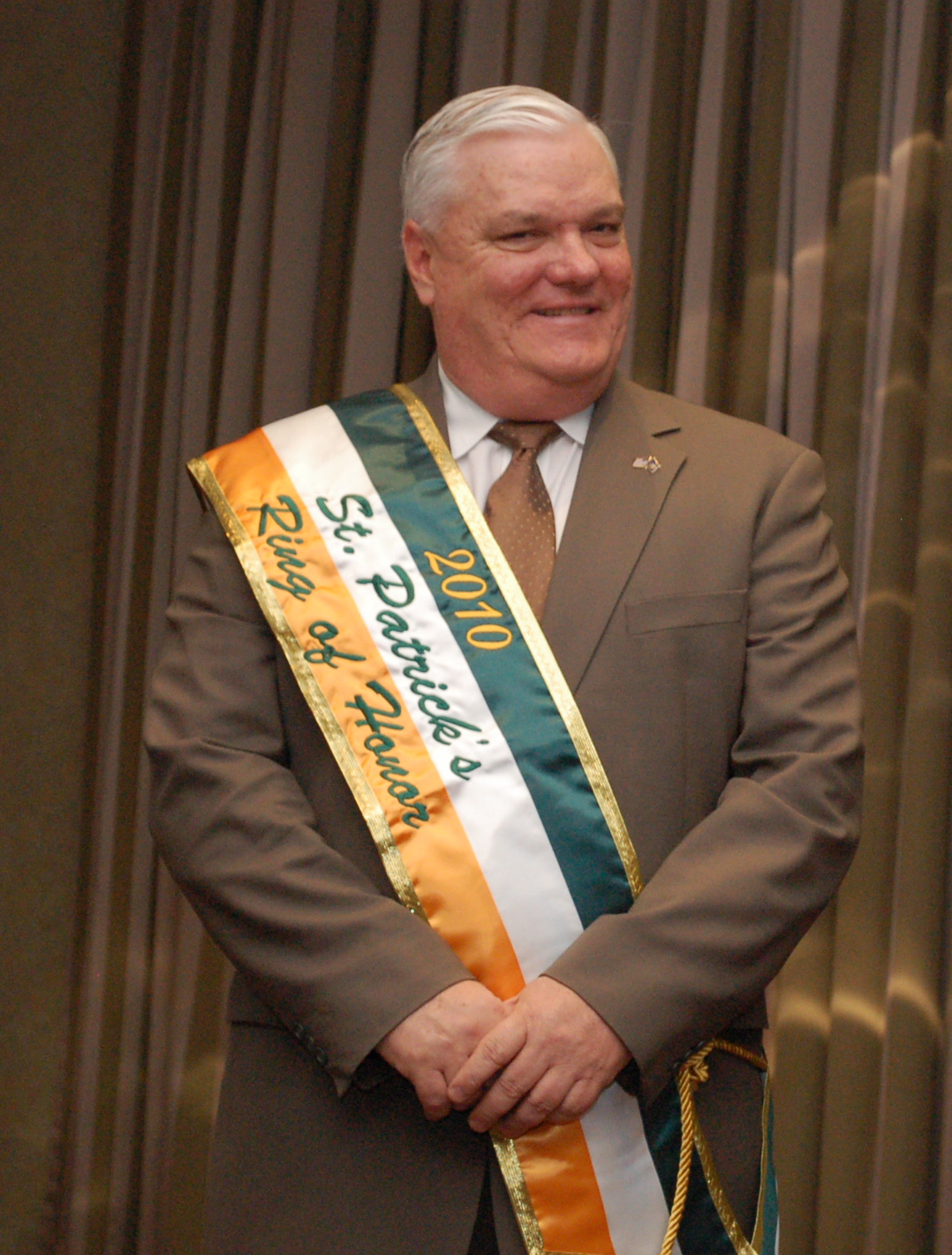
- Keller being honored by the Friendly Sons of St. Patrick, 2010

Member of the Pennsylvania House of Representatives from the 184th district
- In office January 5, 1993 – January 3, 2019
- Preceded by: Connie McHugh
- Succeeded by: Elizabeth Fiedler

Personal details
- Born: January 19, 1951 (age 75) Philadelphia, Pennsylvania
- Party: Democratic
- Children: 2 children
- Education: La Salle University
- Occupation: Longshoreman

William F. "Bill" Keller (born January 19, 1951) is an American politician who was a Democratic member of the Pennsylvania House of Representatives.

== Education ==
In 1968, he graduated from Bishop Neuman High School. He received a degree in business from La Salle University in 1972.

== Career ==
Since 1974, he has been the owner of KO Sporting Goods in Philadelphia. He also worked as a longshoreman from 1968 to 1992 and was a member of the International Longshoremen's Association, Local 1291. He was first elected to represent the 184th legislative district in the Pennsylvania House of Representatives in 1992.

On February 16, 2018, Keller announced that he would not run for another term.

== Criminal investigation ==
On August 18, 2010, the Federal Bureau of Investigation and the Internal Revenue Service raided the homes and offices of Keller and his business partner, Mark Olkowski, as well as his chief of staff, Lorraine DiSpaldo, and a former staffer and then traffic court judge, Robert Mulgrew. Olkowski, DiSpaldo, and Mulgrew later pleaded guilty to various fraud and tax-evasion charges. Keller was never charged with any crime, and claimed to be unaware of the criminal activity.
