= Leonie Archer =

English writer

Léonie Archer
- Born: 25 April 1955 (age 71); Crosby, Lancashire
- Known for: Work on Jewish women in ancient history

Academic background
- Education: University of Oxford

Academic work
- Discipline: Jewish studies, Women's studies
- Institutions: Oxford Centre for Hebrew and Jewish Studies

Léonie Jane Archer (born 25 April 1955 in Crosby, Lancashire) is an English author and a former Research Fellow in Environmental Studies at the Oxford Institute for Energy Studies.

Archer graduated from the University of Oxford in 1981, with ancient history honours, and became a Fellow in Jewish Studies of the Graeco-Roman Period, Oxford Centre for Hebrew Studies, and Junior Fellow, Wolfson College, Oxford. Besides publishing on environmental issues, her best known works involve Jewish women in ancient history, and the history of slavery. Her Price is Beyond Rubies: the Jewish Woman in Graeco-Roman Palestine was one of the first comprehensive studies on Jewish women in antiquity.

== Works ==
=== Books ===
- Archer, Léonie J. (1987). Oxford Centre for Postgraduate Hebrew Studies: a Bibliography of Publications, 1972-1986. Oxford: Oxford Centre for Postgraduate Hebrew Studies. OCLC 20491505.
- ——— (1989). Her Price is Beyond Rubies: the Jewish Woman in Graeco-Roman Palestine. Sheffield: Sheffield Academic Press. ISBN 1-85075-079-3. OCLC 20130793.
- ——— (1990). The Gulf Crisis: Implications for the Environment. Oxford: Oxford Institute for Energy Studies. ISBN 0-948061-48-0.
- ——— (1992). Exhausting Our Options: Fuel Efficient Cars and the Environment. Oxford: Oxford Institute for Energy Studies. ISBN 0-948061-72-3.
- ——— (1993). Aircraft Emissions and the Environment. Oxford: Oxford Institute for Energy Studies. ISBN 0-948061-79-0.
- ——— (1995). Environmentalists Vs. Oil Producers: Clearing Misunderstanding for Constructive Action. Oxford: Oxford Institute for Energy Studies. ISBN 0-948061-85-5.
- ——— (1996). Oil Tankers & Pollution Laws. Oxford: Oxford Institute for Energy Studies. ISBN 0-948061-91-X.

=== Edited by ===
- ———, ed. (1988). Slavery: And Other Forms of Unfree Labour. History workshop series. London & New York: Routledge. ISBN 9780203331811. OCLC 52148559.
- ———; Fischler, Susan; Wyke, Maria, eds. (1994). Women in Ancient Societies: an illusion of the night. New York: Routledge. ISBN 9780415908818. OCLC 28677450.

=== Chapters ===
- ——— (1983). "The Role of Jewish Women in the Religion, Ritual and Cult of Graeco-Roman Palestine". In Cameron, Averil; Kuhrt, Amélie (eds.). Images of Women in Antiquity. Detroit, IL: Wayne State University Press. pp. 273–288. ISBN 0-8143-1762-6.
- ——— (1990). "Bound by Blood: Circumcision and Menstrual Taboo in Post-Exilic Judaism". In Soskice, Janet Martin (ed.). After Eve: Women, Theology and the Christian Tradition. London: Marshall Pickering. ISBN 0-551-02039-3.
- ——— (1990). "Gender and Ritual in the Judaeo-Christian Tradition". In Joseph, Alison (ed.). Through the Devil's Gateway: Women, Religion and Taboo. London: SPCK Channel Four Television. ISBN 0-281-04467-8.
- ——— (1994). "Notions of community and the exclusion of the female in Jewish history and historiography". In ———; Fischler, Susan; Wyke, Maria (eds.). Women in Ancient Societies: an illusion of the night. New York: Routledge. pp. 53–69. ISBN 9780415908818. OCLC 28677450.

=== Journal articles ===
- ——— (1987). "The Virgin and the Harlot in the Writings of Formative Judaism". History Workshop Journal. 24 (1). Oxford: Oxford University Press: 228.
