= Maria Wyke =

British academic and scholar of Latin

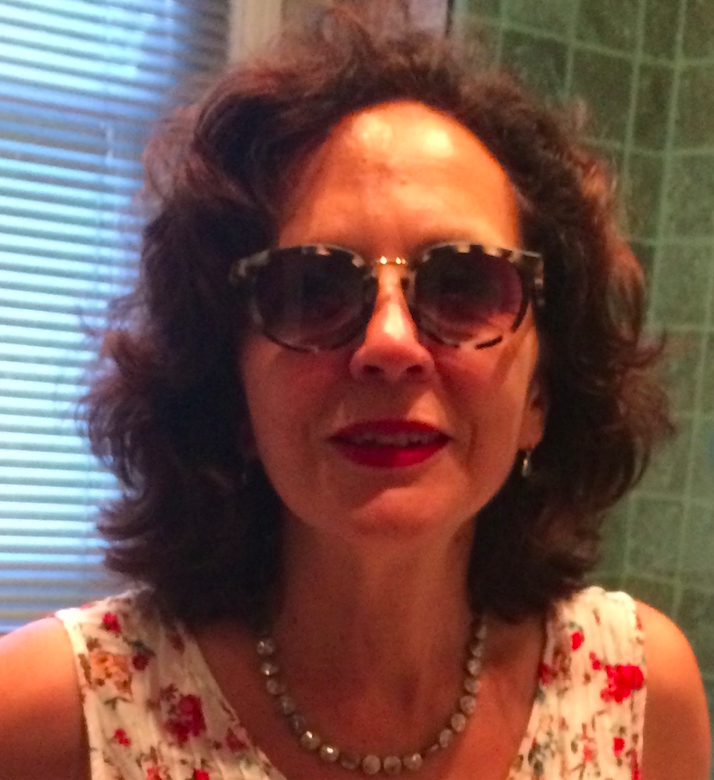
- Born: 13 July 1957 (age 69); London
- Occupation: Professor of Latin at UCL

Maria Wyke (born 13 July 1957) is professor of Latin at University College, London. She is a specialist in Latin love poetry, classical reception studies, and the interpretation of the roles of men and women in the ancient world. She has also written widely on the role of the figure of Julius Caesar in Western culture.

== Early life ==
Maria Wyke was born in London in 1957 to a Mexican mother and an Australian father. She was educated at Catholic schools and studied classics at Somerville College, Oxford (1976–1980). She subsequently completed her PhD at King's College, Cambridge.

== Career ==
Wyke began her academic career at Manchester University from where she joined Queen's College, Oxford and the Newnham College, Cambridge. In 1992 she took a year out to study film and television at the British Film Institute, and then she joined the University of Reading where she became professor of Latin. She joined University College, London, in September 2005 as professor of Latin.

Her research relates to Latin love poetry and the interpretation of the roles of men and women in the ancient world. She is co-director of the Centre for Research in the Dynamics of Civilisation (CREDOC) and deputy Director of UCL's Centre for Humanities Interdisciplinary Research Programmes (CHIRP).

External videos
- Caesar in the USA and Antiquity in Silent Cinema, with Maria Wyke

While at Cambridge, Wyke began researching how the Romans were presented in film, with encouragement from Mary Beard. At the time there had been little research into the portrayal of Romans in 20th-century popular culture. She received funding from the Wingate Foundation, the British School at Rome and the British Academy, and published a book on the subject in 1997, Projecting the Past: Ancient Rome, Cinema and History. Wyke subsequently received a Balsdon Fellowship from the British School at Rome to build on this research, looking at Derek Jarman's film Sebastiane and the role of the figure of Julius Caesar in Western culture. For the latter, she edited a collection of essays on the subject that was published by Blackwell in 2006 (Julius Caesar in Western Culture), authoring Caesar: A Life in Western Culture (Granta, 2007; University of Chicago, 2008) and more recently writing Caesar in the USA which was published by University of California Press in 2012.

== Personal life ==
Wyke is married and has a daughter.

== Selected publications ==
- An Illusion of the Night: Women in Ancient Societies, Macmillan, 1994. (Editor with Leonie Archer and Susan Fischler)
- Projecting the Past: Ancient Rome, Cinema and History, Routledge, 1997.
- Gender and the Body in the Ancient Mediterranean, Blackwell, 1998. (Editor)
- Parchments of Gender: Deciphering the Bodies of Antiquity, Oxford University Press, 1998. (Editor)
- The Uses and Abuses of Antiquity, Peter Lang, 1999. (Editor with Michael Biddiss)
- The Roman Mistress: Ancient and Modern Representations, Oxford University Press, 2002.
- Roman Bodies: From Antiquity to the Eighteenth Century, British School at Rome, 2005. (Editor with Andrew Hopkins)
- Julius Caesar in Western Culture, Blackwell, 2006. (Editor)
- Caesar: A Life in Western Culture, Granta, 2007; University of Chicago, 2008.
- Perceptions of Horace: A Roman Poet and His Readers, 2009. (Edited with Luke Houghton)
- Caesar in the USA, University of California Press, 2012.
- Antiquity in Silent Cinema, Cambridge University Press, 2013. (Edited with Pantelis Michelakis)
