= Pennsylvania House of Representatives, District 184 =

American legislative district

Pennsylvania's 184th State House of Representatives district
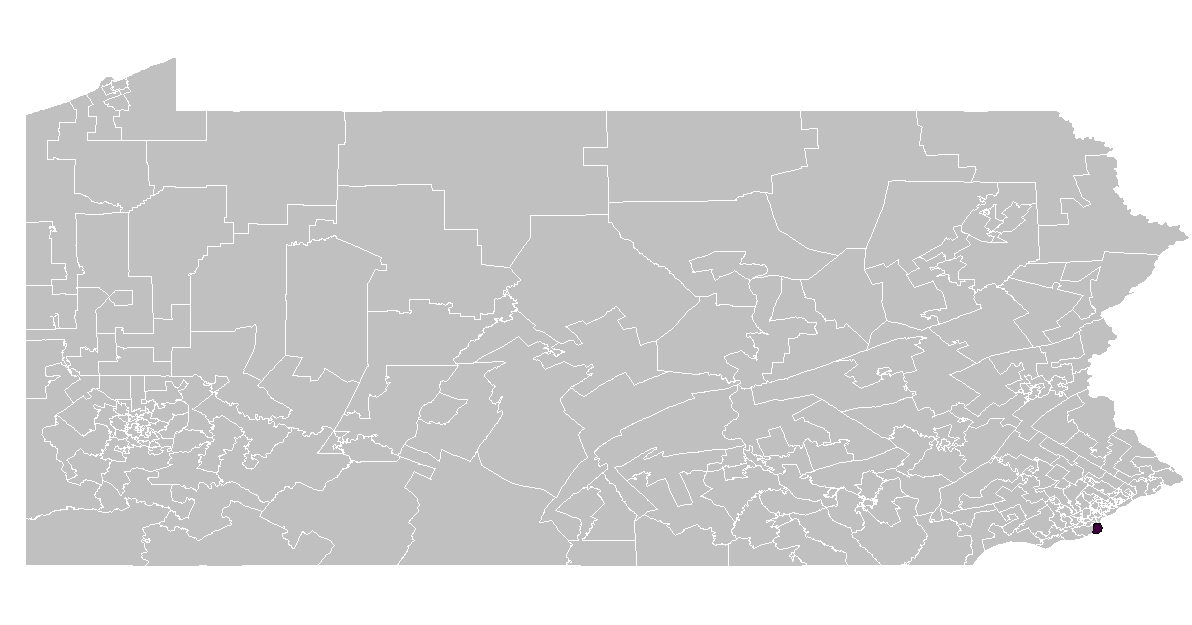
Representative
Elizabeth Fiedler; D–Philadelphia
- Demographics: 64.2% White; 7.8% Black; 11.5% Hispanic
- Population (2011) • Citizens of voting age: 61,487; 49,911

The 184th Pennsylvania House of Representatives District is located in Philadelphia and has been represented since 2019 by Elizabeth Fiedler.

== District profile ==
The 184th Pennsylvania House of Representatives District is located in Philadelphia County and encompasses the Two Street neighborhoods (Pennsport and Whitman), Wells Fargo Center, Lincoln Financial Field and Citizens Bank Park. It also includes the following areas:

- Ward 01
- Ward 39
- Ward 48 [PART, Divisions 14 and 20]

== Representatives ==
Representative	Party	Years	District home	Note
Prior to 1969, seats were apportioned by county.
Leland Beloff	Republican	1969 – 1970		
Michael Ozzie Myers	Democratic	1971 – 1976		
Leland Beloff	Republican	1977 – 1984		Resigned May 3, 1984.
Joseph Howlett	Democratic	1985 – 1990		
Connie McHugh	Republican	1991 – 1992		
William F. Keller	Democratic	1993 – 2018		
Elizabeth Fiedler	Democratic	2019 – present		Incumbent

== Recent election results ==
PA House election, 2010: Pennsylvania House, District 184
Party	Candidate	Votes	%	±%
Democratic	William F. Keller	11,327	78.44	
Republican	Stephen Pico	3,114	21.56	
Margin of victory		8,213	56.88	
Turnout		14,441	100.0	

PA House election, 2012: Pennsylvania House, District 184
Party	Candidate	Votes	%	±%
Democratic	William F. Keller	19,277	100.0	
Margin of victory				
Turnout		19,277	100.0	

PA House election, 2014: Pennsylvania House, District 184
Party	Candidate	Votes	%	±%
Democratic	William F. Keller	11,758	100.0	
Margin of victory				
Turnout		11,758	100.0	

PA House election, 2016: Pennsylvania House, District 184
Party	Candidate	Votes	%	±%
Democratic	William F. Keller	21,206	100.0	
Margin of victory				
Turnout		21,206	100	
