= Marušić =

Marušić (Serbian Cyrillic: Марушић, pronounced [mǎruʃitɕ]) is a Serbian and a Croatian family name.

People with the name include:

- Adam Marušić (born 1992), Serbian footballer
- Joško Marušić (born 1952), Croatian film-maker and comic artist
- Zoran Marušić (born 1993), Serbian footballer

== See also ==
- Marušič
