= Brigitte Servatius =

Austrian American mathematician

Brigitte Irma Servatius (born 1954) is a mathematician specializing in matroids and structural rigidity. She is a professor of mathematics at Worcester Polytechnic Institute, and has been the editor-in-chief of the Pi Mu Epsilon Journal since 1999.

== Education and career ==
Servatius is originally from Graz in Austria. As a student at an all-girl gymnasium in Graz that specialized in language studies rather than mathematics, her interest in mathematics was sparked by her participation in a national mathematical olympiad, and she went on to earn master's degrees in mathematics and physics at the University of Graz.

She became a high school mathematics and science teacher in Leibnitz. She moved to the US in 1981, to begin doctoral studies at Syracuse University. She completed her Ph.D. in 1987, and joined the Worcester Polytechnic Institute faculty in the same year. Her dissertation, Planar Rigidity, was supervised by Jack Graver.

== Contributions ==
While still in Austria, Servatius began working on combinatorial group theory, and her first publication (appearing while she was a graduate student) is in that subject.^{[Z]} She switched to the theory of structural rigidity for her doctoral research, and later became the author (with Jack Graver and Herman Servatius) of the book Combinatorial Rigidity (1993).^{[G]} Another well-cited paper of hers in this area characterizes the planar Laman graphs, the minimally rigid graphs that can be embedded without crossings in the plane, as the graphs of pseudotriangulations, partitions of a plane region into subregions with three convex corners studied in computational geometry.^{[H]}

Servatius is also the co-editor of a book on matroid theory.^{[B]} With Tomaž Pisanski she wrote the book Configurations from a Graphical Viewpoint (2013), on configurations of points and lines in the plane with the same number of points touching each two lines and the same number of lines touching each two points.^{[P]} Other topics in her research include graph duality^{[S]} and the triconnected components of infinite graphs.^{[D]}

== Selected publications ==
Z.	Servatius, Brigitte (1983), "A short proof of a theorem of Burns", Mathematische Zeitschrift, 184 (1): 133–137, doi:10.1007/BF01162012, MR 0711734, S2CID 120011455

G.	Graver, Jack; Servatius, Brigitte; Servatius, Herman (1993), Combinatorial rigidity, Graduate Studies in Mathematics, vol. 2, Providence, RI: American Mathematical Society, doi:10.1090/gsm/002, ISBN 0-8218-3801-6, MR 1251062

D.	Droms, Carl; Servatius, Brigitte; Servatius, Herman (1995), "The structure of locally finite two-connected graphs", Electronic Journal of Combinatorics, 2 R17, doi:10.37236/1211, MR 1346878

S.	Servatius, Brigitte; Servatius, Herman (1996), "Self-dual graphs", Discrete Mathematics, 149 (1–3): 223–232, doi:10.1016/0012-365X(94)00351-I, MR 1375109

B.	Bonin, Joseph E.; Oxley, James G.; Servatius, Brigitte, eds. (1996), Matroid Theory: Proceedings of the AMS-IMS-SIAM Joint Summer Research Conference held at the University of Washington, Seattle, Washington, July 2–6, 1995, Contemporary Mathematics, vol. 197, Providence, RI: American Mathematical Society, doi:10.1090/conm/197, ISBN 0-8218-0508-8, MR 1411689

H.	Haas, Ruth; Orden, David; Rote, Günter; Santos, Francisco; Servatius, Brigitte; Servatius, Herman; Souvaine, Diane; Streinu, Ileana; Whiteley, Walter (2005), "Planar minimally rigid graphs and pseudo-triangulations", Computational Geometry: Theory and Applications, 31 (1–2): 31–61, arXiv:math/0307347, doi:10.1016/j.comgeo.2004.07.003, MR 2131802, S2CID 38637747

P.	Pisanski, Tomaž; Servatius, Brigitte (2013), Configurations from a graphical viewpoint, Birkhäuser Advanced Texts: Basler Lehrbücher. [Birkhäuser Advanced Texts: Basel Textbooks], New York: Birkhäuser/Springer, doi:10.1007/978-0-8176-8364-1, ISBN 978-0-8176-8363-4, MR 2978043
