= Alan Tucker =

American mathematician

Alan Curtiss Tucker is an American mathematician. He is a professor of applied mathematics at Stony Brook University, and the author of a widely used textbook on combinatorics; he has also made research contributions to graph theory and coding theory. He has had four children, Katie, Lisa, Edward, and James.

== Education and career ==
Alan Tucker was born on July 6, 1943. He is the son of Princeton mathematician Albert W. Tucker, who fostered the development of game theory in the mid-20th century – his students included John Nash and two other Economics Nobel Laureates. Alan earned a B.A. from Harvard University in 1965 and a Ph.D. in mathematics from Stanford University in 1969. He joined the Department of Applied Mathematics and Statistics at Stony Brook University in 1970, and has remained there. His initial research interest was in combinatorial mathematics. Since 1989, he has been a S.U.N.Y. Distinguished Teaching Professor at Stony Brook. He chaired the Mathematical Association of America (MAA) project producing the influential report, Recommendations for a General Mathematical Science Major, that catalyzed a re-orientation of the U.S. mathematics major away from pre-doctoral training and towards preparation for a broad range of mathematical careers. In conjunction with that MAA project, he wrote the first textbook for a new course in applied combinatorial mathematics. His textbook has been used in hundreds of colleges and dozens of other textbooks have led to almost every mathematics departments offering a course in this area. In Stony Brook, he developed a successful major embodying the MAA report's recommendations: this major currently graduates over 400 students a year, 10% of all U.S. applied math B.S.'s. He was the lead writer of the widely-cited 2001 national report, The Mathematical Education of Teachers, that debunked the prevailing view that if future school teachers studied beginning college-level mathematics or majored in mathematics, there would be a trickle-down effect giving them mastery of primary school or secondary school mathematics, respectively. In directing subsequent projects to improve pre-service education of mathematics teachers, he organized workshops of mathematicians and mathematics educators that sketched out the foundation for the Common Core Curriculum in Mathematics.

== Awards and honors ==
In 1994, Tucker received the Deborah and Franklin Haimo Award for Distinguished College or University Teaching of Mathematics.

In 2009, Tucker was named a fellow of the American Association for the Advancement of Science.

He became one of the inaugural fellows of the American Mathematical Society in 2013.

== Selected publications ==
- Hu, T. C.; Tucker, A. C. (1971), "Optimal computer search trees and variable-length alphabetical codes", SIAM Journal on Applied Mathematics, 21 (4): 514–532, doi:10.1137/0121057, MR 0304063.
- Tucker, Alan (1975), "Coloring a family of circular arcs", SIAM Journal on Applied Mathematics, 29 (3): 493–502, doi:10.1137/0129040, MR 0437378.
- Tucker, Alan (1980), Applied Combinatorics, John Wiley & Sons, Inc., New York, ISBN 0-471-04766-X, MR 0591461. 3rd ed., 1995, MR 1287611. 6th ed., 2012, ISBN 978-0-470-45838-9.

== See also ==
- Hu-Tucker coding
