= Connie McHugh =

American politician (1938–1997)

Member of the Pennsylvania House of Representatives from the 184th district
- In office January 1, 1991 – November 30, 1992
- Preceded by: Joseph Howlett
- Succeeded by: William F. Keller

Personal details
- Born: December 8, 1938
- Died: September 20, 1997 (aged 58) Philadelphia, Pennsylvania, United States
- Party: Republican

Connie Black McHugh (December 8, 1938 – September 20, 1997) was a former Republican member of the Pennsylvania House of Representatives. She died from lung cancer in 1997.

== Formative years ==
Born as Constance Black in Philadelphia, Pennsylvania on December 8, 1938, Connie Black McHugh was a daughter of Arch and Florence Black and a graduate of Hallahan High School. She later married Fran Hugh.

== Political activism and public service career ==
During the 1970s, Constance McHugh became a political activist, advocating for community improvements in the South Philadelphia neighborhood of Pennsport. "The neighborhood was starting to fray around the edges," she explained during a 1973 newspaper interview. "I didn't want to move out. I knew I could stay and watch it become a slum or do something about it."

Employed as a court officer in Philadelphia for sixteen years, she subsequently worked as an administrator for the office of the Pennsylvania Auditor General. Appointed to the Mayor's Commission on Women in Philadelphia, she served on that commission from 1980 to 1982. In 1987, she ran unsuccessfully for a seat on the Philadelphia City Council.

In 1990, she ran for, and won, a seat in the Pennsylvania House of Representatives. Representing the 184th legislative district, she served during the 1991 and 1992 legislative sessions. She was also appointed to the Pennsylvania Heritage Affairs Commission, a post she held from 1991 to 1992. After running again unsuccessfully for the Philadelphia City Council in 1992, she became a legislative assistant to Pennsylvania State Representative John Perzel in 1993. From 1994 to 1997, she served as a trial commissioner for the Philadelphia City Court.

== Honors ==
In 1973, she was presented with a national good citizenship award by Stouffer's Management Food Service.

== Death and interment ==
McHugh succumbed to complications from lung cancer on September 20, 1997. Following funeral services, she was buried at the Arlington Cemetery in Drexel Hill, Pennsylvania.
