= Dorijan Marušič =

Slovenian doctor and politician (born 1957)

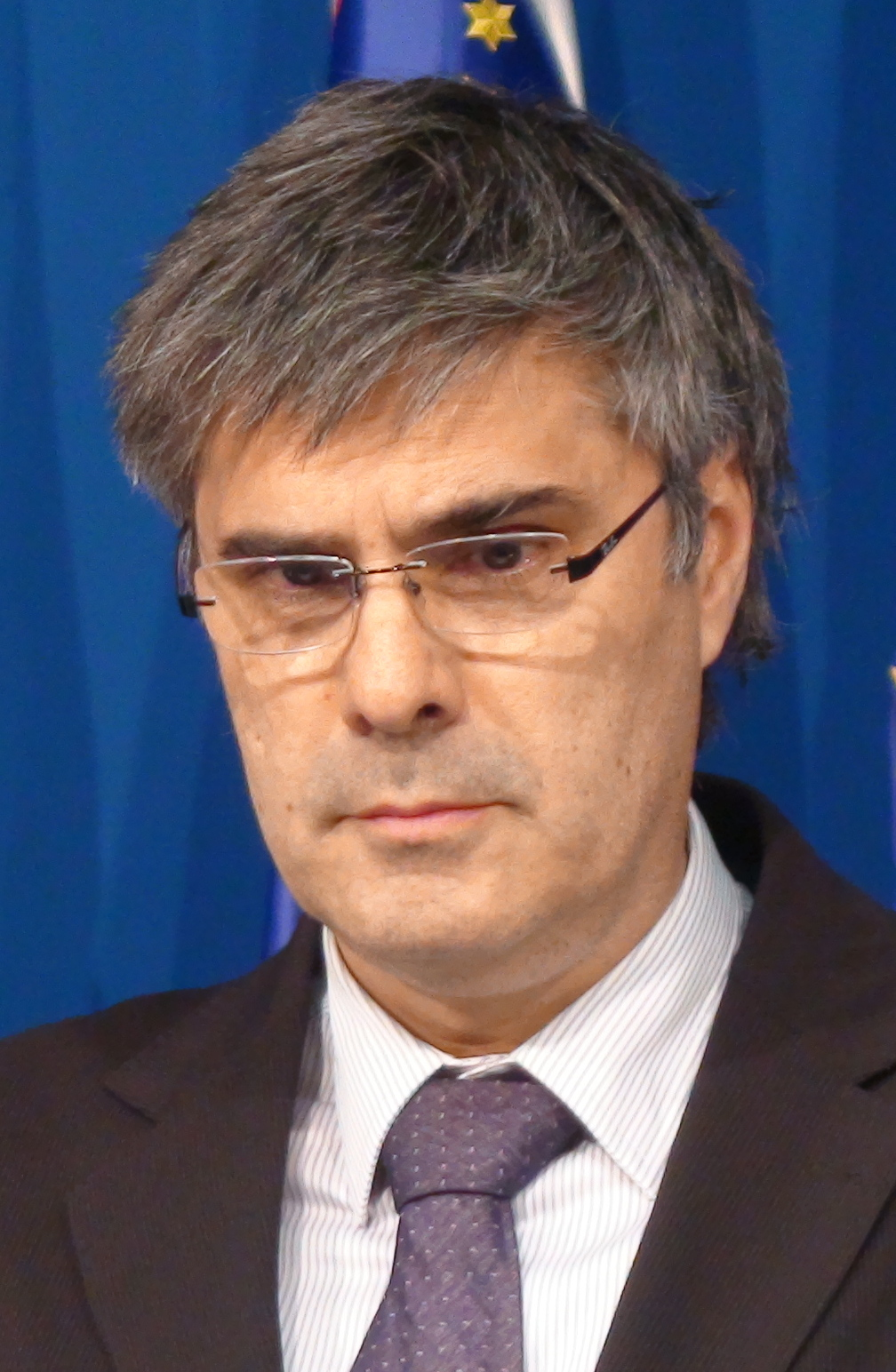
- Marušič in 2015

Minister of Health of Slovenia

Personal details
- Born: 13 June 1957 (age 69) Koper, SR Slovenia, Yugoslavia
- Education: University of Ljubljana
- Occupation: Physician; politician

Dorijan Marušič (born 13 June 1957) is a Slovenian doctor and politician, State Secretary at the Ministry of Health of Slovenia since 2000 and Minister of Health of Slovenia since 2010.

== Education ==
Dorijan Marušič was born in Koper. After graduating from Koper Gumnasium, he attended the University of Ljubljana, Faculty of Natural Sciences and Engineering (1976–1981) graduating in mathematics. Afterwards he attended the Faculty of Medicine in Ljubljana, graduating in 1989. He specialised internal medicine and then worked at Izola General Hospital, the University Clinic in Groningen and the Ljubljana University Medical Centre, until 1995. In 2003, he enrolled in post-graduate studies in management of non-profit organisations at the Faculty of Social Sciences, University of Ljubljana.

== Career ==
During 1998 to 2000, he was head of the intensive therapy unit at Izola General Hospital. Since May 2002 he became medical director.

After serving as an adviser to the Director-General of the Health Insurance Institute of Slovenia, in December 2000, he was appointed State Secretary at the Ministry of Health of Slovenia, re-appointed in 2004.

Marušič is the author or co-author of over 200 scientific works and over 350 popular articles.

On 7 April 2010 Marušič was sworn Health Minister of Slovenia.

== Personal life ==
His brother, Dragan Marušič is a mathematician.
