= Melvin Dresher =

Polish-American mathematician (1911-1992)

- Melvin Dresher, early 1940s
- Born: March 13, 1911; Krasnystaw, Poland
- Died: June 4, 1992 (aged 81); Kern, California, US
- Education: Lehigh University; Yale University
- Known for: Prisoner's dilemma
- Scientific career
- Fields: Mathematics
- Institutions: Michigan State College; War Production Board; National Defense Research Committee; Catholic University of America; RAND
- Doctoral advisor: Øystein Ore

Melvin Dresher (born Dreszer; March 13, 1911 – June 4, 1992) was a Polish-born American mathematician, notable for developing, alongside Merrill Flood, the game theoretical model of cooperation and conflict known as the Prisoner's dilemma while at RAND in 1950 (Albert W. Tucker gave the game its prison-sentence interpretation, and thus the name by which it is known today).

== Education and career ==
The Mathematics of Games of Strategy: Theory and Applications by Melvin Dresher

Dresher came to the United States in 1923. He obtained his B.S. from Lehigh University in 1933 and went on to complete his Ph.D. at Yale University in 1937 under the supervision of Øystein Ore. His dissertation was titled "Multi-Groups: A Generalisation of the Notion of Group." Dresher's career began as instructor of mathematics at Michigan State College from 1938 to 1941, he then served as statistician for the War Production Board from 1941 to 1944, and worked as a mathematical physicist for the National Defense Research Committee from 1944 to 1946 Dresher became a professor of mathematics at the Catholic University of America from 1946 to 1947, before joining RAND in 1948 as a research mathematician.

Dresher was the author of several RAND research papers on game theory, and his widely acclaimed book The Mathematics of Games of Strategy: Theory and Applications (originally published in 1961 as Games of Strategy: Theory and Applications) continues to be studied today. Dresher's research has been referenced and discussed in a variety of published books, including Prisoner's Dilemma by William Poundstone and A Beautiful Mind by Sylvia Nasar.

== Family ==
Dresher married Martha Whitaker in 1937 and had a son, Paul Dresher, and a daughter.

== Bibliography ==
- Bohnenblust, H.; Dresher, Melvin; Girshick, M.; Harris, Theodore; Helmer-Hirschberg, Olaf; McKinsey, J.; Shapley, Lloyd; Snow, R. (1948). Mathematical Theory of Zero-Sum Two-Person Games with a Finite Number or a Continuum of Strategies. RAND Corporation. doi:10.7249/r115.
- Berge, Claude; Dresher, Melvin, eds. (1970). Contributions to the theory of games. 3: C. Berge ... Ed. by M. Dresher. Annals of mathematics studies (4. print ed.). Princeton, NJ: Princeton Univ. Pr. ISBN 978-0-691-07936-3.
- Dresher, Melvin (1981). The mathematics of games of strategy: theory and applications (unabridged republ. of the [ed.] ... Englewood Cliffs, N.J., 1961 ed.). New York: Dover. ISBN 978-0-486-64216-1.
- Dresher, M.; Aumann, R. J., eds. (1985). Advances in game theory. Annals of mathematics studies (Repr. from the hardcover ed.). Princeton, NJ: Princeton Univ. Press. ISBN 978-0-691-07902-8.
- Dresher, Melvin (2007). Games of strategy: theory and applications (New RAND ed.). Santa Monica, Calif: RAND Corp. ISBN 978-0-8330-4225-5.
