= Merrill M. Flood =

American mathematician and systems analyst (1908–1991)

Merrill Meeks Flood
- Born: 1908
- Died: 1991 (aged 82–83)
- Education: University of Nebraska; Princeton University
- Occupation: Mathematician
- Known for: Game theory, Prisoner's dilemma

Merrill Meeks Flood (1908–1991) was an American mathematician, notable for developing, with Melvin Dresher, the basis of the game theoretical Prisoner's dilemma model of cooperation and conflict while being at RAND in 1950 (Albert W. Tucker gave the game its prison-sentence interpretation, and thus the name by which it is known today).

== Biography ==
Flood received an MA in mathematics at the University of Nebraska, and a PhD at Princeton University in 1935 under the supervision of Joseph Wedderburn, for the dissertation Division by Non-singular Matric Polynomials.

In the 1930s he started working at Princeton University, and after the War he worked at the Rand Corporation, Columbia University, the University of Michigan and the University of California.

Flood was one of the founding members of TIMS and became its second President in 1955. By the end of the 1950s, he was among the first members of the Society for General Systems Research. In 1961, he was elected President of the Operations Research Society of America (ORSA), and from 1962 to 1965 he served as Vice President of the Institute of Industrial Engineers. In 1983 he was awarded ORSA's George E. Kimball Medal.

He was elected to the 2002 class of Fellows of the Institute for Operations Research and the Management Sciences.

== Work ==
Flood is considered a pioneer in the field of management science and operations research, who has been able to apply their techniques to problems on many levels of society. According to Xu (2001) "as early as 1936–1946, he applied innovative systems analysis to public problems and developed cost-benefit analysis in the civilian sector and cost effectiveness analysis in the military sector".

=== Traveling salesman problem ===
In the 1940s Flood publicized the name Traveling salesman problem (TSP) within the mathematical community at mass. He publicized the TSP in 1948 by presenting it at the RAND Corporation. According to Flood "when I was struggling with the problem in connecting with a school-bus routing study in New Jersey".

Even more important, as far as common usage goes, Flood himself claimed to have coined the term "software" in the late 1940s.

=== Hitchcock transportation problem ===
Equally at home in his original field of the mathematics of matrices and in the pragmatic trenches of the industrial engineer, his research addressed an array of operations research problems. His 1953 paper on the Hitchcock transportation problem is often cited, but he also published work on the traveling salesman problem, and an algorithm for solving the von Neumann hide and seek problem.

== Publications ==
- 1948, A Game Theoretic Study of the Tactics of Area Defense, RAND Research Memorandum
- 1949, Illustrative example of application of Koopmans' transportation theory to scheduling military tanker fleet, RAND Research Memorandum.
- 1951, A Preference Experiment. RAND Research Paper
- 1951, A Preference Experiment (Series 2, Trial 1).RAND Research Paper
- 1952, A Preference Experiment (Series 2, Trials 2, 3, 4). RAND Research Paper
- 1952, Aerial Bombing Tactics : General Considerations (A World War II Study), RAND Research Memorandum.
- 1952, On Game-Learning Theory and Some Decision-Making Experiments. RAND Research Paper
- 1952, Preference Experiment. RAND Research Memorandum
- 1952, Some Group Interaction Models. RAND Research Memorandum
