= Frank Talent =

American journalist and announcer (1936–2011)

Frank Talent (né Tallett; 1936 – September 8, 2011) was a former political figure and journalist in the Philadelphia area, best known for his time as a Pennsylvania State Athletic Commission representative who oversaw boxing and professional wrestling.

== Early life ==
Francis R. Tallett was an orphan born in 1936 in Philadelphia, Pennsylvania who attended school at St. Joseph's House for Homeless Industrious Boys.

== Politics ==
Talent unsuccessfully challenged Harry Jannotti for the vacant 7th District Philadelphia City Council seat in 1969. He worked as an officer for Philadelphia Municipal Court, and later as a public relations representative of Mayor Frank Rizzo. William J. Lederer of the Pennsylvania House of Representatives commended Talent for his charitable work in a 1973 proclamation.

The Public Record featured a regular gossip column where Talent would publish political news under his pseudonym of "The Snooper".

== Athletic commission ==
In the 1980s, Talent was appointed acting representative of the Pennsylvania State Athletic Commission. A fan of professional wrestling, he enjoyed being part of the shows and served as ring announcer for World Wrestling Federation events at the Spectrum.

Talent was seen as an ally of hardcore wrestling, as he willingly turned a blind eye to many things Extreme Championship Wrestling did at ECW Arena that violated state regulations, including their excessive use of blood.

Talent hosted a weekly radio program called Frank Talent's Pro Wrestling and Pro Boxing Radio Show on WNJC in 2005.

Following his death, Combat Zone Wrestling held a ten-bell salute for Talent before their show at the former ECW Arena on September 10, 2011.
