= Dragan Marušič =

Slovenian mathematician

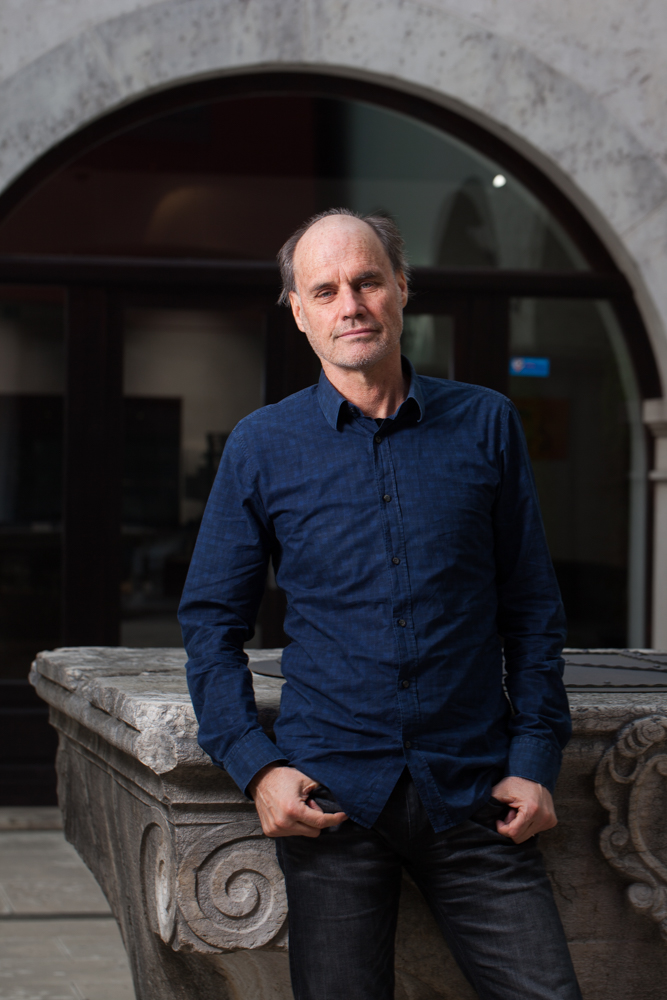
- Born: May 1, 1953 (age 73); Koper, Slovenia, Yugoslavia
- Education: University of Ljubljana; University of Reading
- Scientific career
- Fields: Algebraic graph theory, symmetry of graphs, and the action of finite groups on combinatorial objects.
- Workplaces: University of Ljubljana; University of Primorska
- Doctoral advisor: Crispin Nash-Williams

Dragan Marušič (born 1953, Koper, Slovenia) is a Slovene mathematician. Marušič obtained his BSc in technical mathematics from the University of Ljubljana in 1976, and his PhD from the University of Reading in 1981 under the supervision of Crispin Nash-Williams.

Marušič has published extensively, and has supervised seven PhD students (as of 2013). He served as the third rector of the University of Primorska from 2011 to 2019, a university he lobbied to have established in his home town of Koper. His research focuses on topics in algebraic graph theory, particularly the symmetry of graphs and the action of finite groups on combinatorial objects. He is regarded as the founder of the Slovenian school of research in algebraic graph theory and permutation groups.

== Education and career ==
From 1968 to 1972 Marušič attended gymnasium in Koper. He studied undergraduate mathematics at the University of Ljubljana, graduating in 1976. He completed his PhD in 1981 in England, at the University of Reading under the supervision of Crispin Nash-Williams.

After completing a post-doctoral fellowship at the University of Reading in 1983, Marušič spent a year teaching high school mathematics in Koper. He worked for one year at the University of Minnesota Duluth as an assistant professor, and then spent three years at the University of California, Santa Cruz, from 1985 to 1988. In 1988, he returned to Slovenia to work at the University of Ljubljana, where he rose quickly through the ranks, becoming a full professor in 1994. He also held the post of vice-rector of student affairs there from 1989 to 1991. In 1991-92 he spent a year as a Fulbright scholar at the University of California, Santa Cruz.

Marušič maintains his post at the University of Ljubljana, although he has also held an appointment at the University of Primorska since 2004, shortly after its founding. He has increasingly devoted his time to the newer university, where he established the Faculty of Mathematics, Natural Sciences, and Information Technologies (UP FAMNIT). He served as the dean of that faculty from 2007 to 2011. He was elected in 2011 as the third rector of the University of Primorska, a position which he held until 2019.

Marušič has supervised seven PhD students, and has supervised or co-supervised six post-doctoral fellows, in addition to numerous master's and honours students. He is one of the two founding editors and editors-in-chief (with Tomaž Pisanski) of the journal Ars Mathematica Contemporanea.

== Achievements and honours ==
Marušič is regarded as the founder of the Slovenian school of research in algebraic graph theory and permutation groups.

In 2002 he received the Zois Award, the highest scientific award in Slovenia, for his achievements in the field of graph theory and algebra. Since 2010, he has been a member of the committee that selects the Zois Award recipients, as well as the recipients of other scientific honours from the government of Slovenia.

== Research ==
In his research, Marušič has focused on the actions of permutation groups on graphs. Some of his major contributions have been on the topics of the existence of semiregular automorphisms (see group action for an explanation of this) of vertex-transitive graphs, the existence of Hamiltonian paths and cycles in vertex-transitive graphs, and the structures of semi-symmetric graphs and half-transitive graphs. With co-authors, he proved that the Gray graph on 54 vertices is the smallest cubic semi-symmetric graph.

He has well over 100 publications.

== Personal life ==
Marušič is married and has two sons. His brother, Dorijan Marušič was the Minister of Health for Slovenia.

== Selected publications ==
- Marušič, D. (1981). "On vertex symmetric digraphs". Discrete Math. 36: 69–81. doi:10.1016/0012-365x(81)90174-6.
- Alspach, B.; Marušič, D.; Nowitz, L. (1994). "Constructing graphs which are 1/2-transitive". J. Austral. Math. Soc. Ser. A. 56 (3): 391–402. doi:10.1017/s1446788700035564.
- Alspach, B; Conder, M.; Marušič, D.; Xu, M.-Y. (1996). "A classification of 2-arc-transitive circulants". Journal of Algebraic Combinatorics. 5 (2): 83–86. doi:10.1023/A:1022456615990.
- Marušič, D.; Xu, M.-Y. (1997). "A 1/2-transitive graph of valency 4 with a nonsolvable group of automorphisms". Journal of Graph Theory. 25 (2): 133–138. doi:10.1002/(sici)1097-0118(199706)25:2<133::aid-jgt5>3.3.co;2-9.
- Marušič, D. (1998). "Half-transitive group actions on finite graphs of valency 4". J. Combin. Theory Ser. B. 73: 41–76. doi:10.1006/jctb.1997.1807.
- Marušič, D.; Nedela, R. (1998). "Maps and half-transitive graphs of valency 4". European J. Combin. 19 (3): 345–354. doi:10.1006/eujc.1998.0187.
- Marušič, D.; Praeger, C. E. (1999). "Tetravalent graphs admitting half-transitive group actions: alternating cycles". J. Combin. Theory Ser. B. 75 (2): 108–205. doi:10.1006/jctb.1998.1875.
- Cameron, P.; Giudici, M.; Jones, G.; Kantor, W.; Klin, M.; Marušič, D.; Nowitz, L. (2002). "Transitive permutation groups without semiregular subgroups". J. London Math. Soc. 66 (2): 325–333. doi:10.1112/s0024610702003484. S2CID 1391700.
- Malnič, A.; Marušič, D.; Potočnik, P.; Wang, C. (2004). "An Infinite Family of Cubic Edge-Transitive but Not Vertex-Transitive Graphs". Discrete Math. 280 (1–3): 133–148. doi:10.1016/j.disc.2003.07.004.
