= University of Primorska =

3rd public university of Slovenia

- Univerza na Primorskem
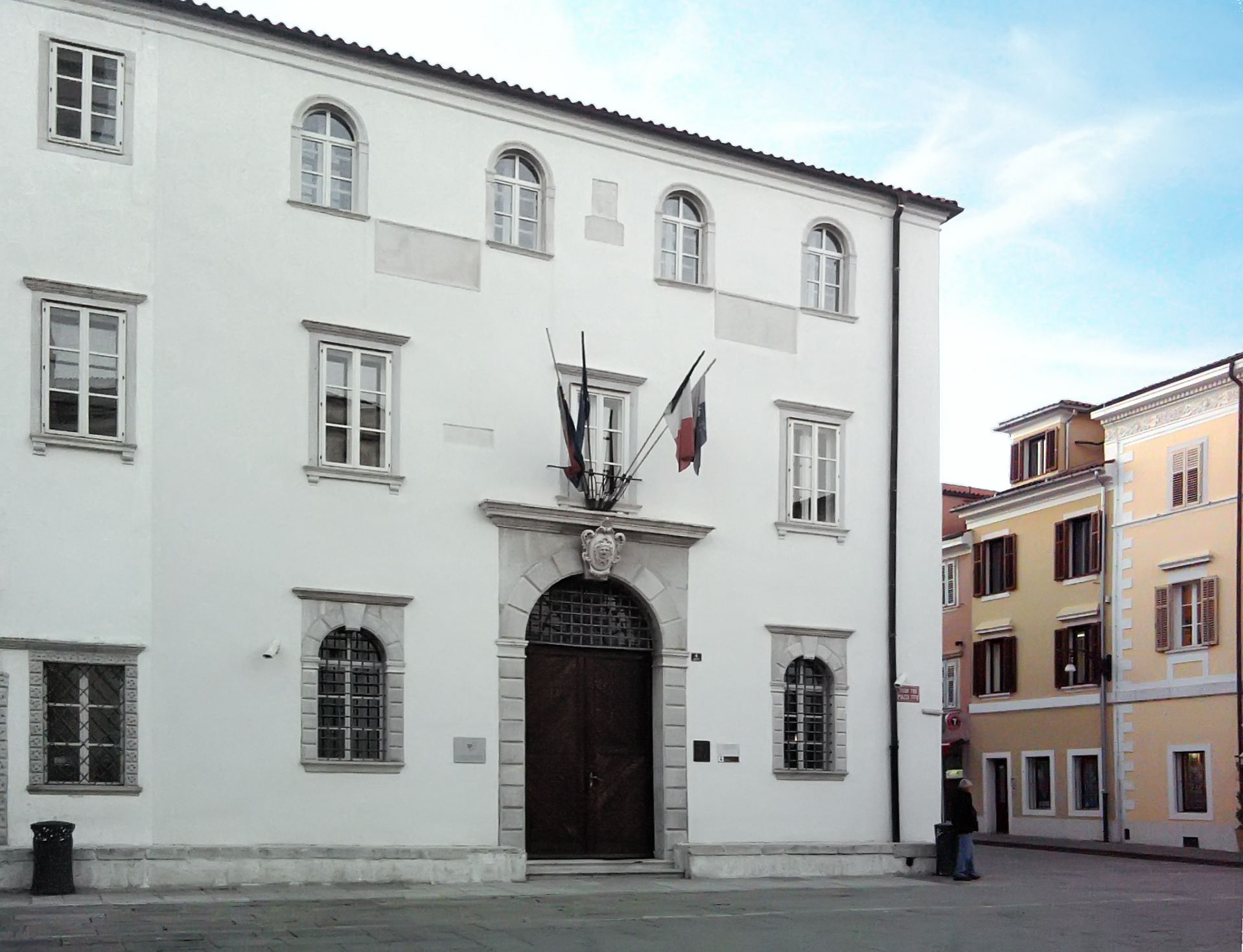
- Type: Public
- Established: 2003; 23 years ago
- Rector: Klavdija Kutnar
- Administrative staff: 632
- Students: 6,041
- Location: Koper, Slovenia; 45°32′53.71″N 13°43′45.78″E
- Website: www.upr.si

University rankings

Regional – Overall
- QS Emerging Europe and Central Asia: 144 (2022)

University of Primorska (Slovenian Univerza na Primorskem, Italian Università del Litorale) is a public university in Slovenia. It is located in Koper, Izola, and Portorož and is named for the Slovene Littoral region, where it is located.

== History ==
The very first efforts to found a Slovenian university in the Littoral were made almost one hundred years ago, whereas the first concrete steps towards the establishment of a new Slovene university were taken after the country had become independent. Thus 1992 saw the preparation of the expert study of the development of higher education in the Littoral, and a year later a letter of intent was signed envisioning the establishment of the University Study Centre. In 1995, the Slovene Science and Research Centre was founded in order to garner the intellectual potential of the future university, while 1996 witnessed the formation of the University Study Centre of Koper, which facilitated the development of higher education in the region and prepared the legal basis for founding the university. Two years later, the letter of intent was also signed by representatives of the regional economic sector and by regional chambers of commerce.

Finally, on 29 January 2003, the Slovene Parliament passed the University of Primorska Charter. Two months later, on 17 March 2003, the University of Primorska was entered into the register of legal entities kept by the District Court of Koper. The newly established university comprised three faculties, two colleges, and two research institutes.

== Rectors ==
- Lucija Čok (2003–2007)
- Rado Bohinc (2007–2011)
- Dragan Marušič (2011–2019)
- Klavdija Kutnar (2019–present)

== Organization ==
The university is divided into six faculties and one college:

- Faculty of Education, Koper/Capodistria
- Faculty of Humanities, Koper/Capodistria
- Faculty of Management, Koper/Capodistria
- Faculty of Mathematics, Natural Sciences and Information technologies - Koper/Capodistria
- Faculty of Tourism Studies, Portorož/Portorose
- Faculty of Health Care, Izola/Isola d'Istria
- College of Design, Ljubljana/Lubiana

One institute is also part of the University of Primorska: the Andrej Marušič Institute.

== Other universities in Slovenia ==
- University of Ljubljana
- University of Maribor
- University of Nova Gorica
