= Tutte 12-cage =

- The Tutte 12-cage
- Named after: W. T. Tutte
- Vertices: 126
- Edges: 189
- Radius: 6
- Diameter: 6
- Girth: 12
- Automorphisms: 12096
- Chromatic number: 2
- Chromatic index: 3
- Genus: 17
- Properties: Cubic; Cage; Hamiltonian; Semi-symmetric; Bipartite; Distance-regular

In the mathematical field of graph theory, the Tutte 12-cage or Benson graph is a 3-regular graph with 126 vertices and 189 edges. It is named after W. T. Tutte.

The Tutte 12-cage is the unique (3-12)-cage (sequence A052453 in the OEIS). It was discovered by C. T. Benson in 1966. It has chromatic number 2 (bipartite), chromatic index 3, girth 12 (as a 12-cage) and diameter 6. Its crossing number is known to be less than 165, see Wolfram MathWorld.

== Construction ==
The Tutte 12-cage is a cubic Hamiltonian graph and can be defined by the LCF notation [17, 27, −13, −59, −35, 35, −11, 13, −53, 53, −27, 21, 57, 11, −21, −57, 59, −17]^{7}.

There are, up to isomorphism, precisely two generalized hexagons of order (2,2) as proved by Cohen and Tits. They are the split Cayley hexagon H(2) and its point-line dual. Clearly both of them have the same incidence graph, which is in fact isomorphic to the Tutte 12-cage.

The Balaban 11-cage can be constructed by excision from the Tutte 12-cage by removing a small subtree and suppressing the resulting vertices of degree two.

== Algebraic properties ==
The automorphism group of the Tutte 12-cage is of order 12,096 and is a semi-direct product of the projective special unitary group PSU(3,3) with the cyclic group Z/2Z. It acts transitively on its edges but not on its vertices, making it a semi-symmetric graph, a regular graph that is edge-transitive but not vertex-transitive. In fact, the automorphism group of the Tutte 12-cage preserves the bipartite parts and acts primitively on each part. Such graphs are called bi-primitive graphs and only five cubic bi-primitive graphs exist; they are named the Iofinova-Ivanov graphs and are of order 110, 126, 182, 506 and 990.

All the cubic semi-symmetric graphs on up to 768 vertices are known. According to Conder, Malnič, Marušič and Potočnik, the Tutte 12-cage is the unique cubic semi-symmetric graph on 126 vertices and is the fifth smallest possible cubic semi-symmetric graph after the Gray graph, the Iofinova–Ivanov graph on 110 vertices, the Ljubljana graph and a graph on 120 vertices with girth 8.

The characteristic polynomial of the Tutte 12-cage is

$$(x-3)x^{28}(x+3)(x^2-6)^{21}(x^2-2)^{27}.\$$

It is the only graph with this characteristic polynomial; therefore, the 12-cage is determined by its spectrum.

== Gallery ==
The chromatic number of the Tutte 12-cage is 2.

The chromatic index of the Tutte 12-cage is 3.
