= Folkman =

Folkman may refer to:

== People ==
- Jens Christian Folkman Schaanning, a Norwegian politician
- Jon Folkman, an American mathematician
- Judah Folkman, an American medical scientist
- Roy Folkman, an Israeli politician

== Math ==
- Folkman graph, a type of semi-symmetric graph in graph theory
- Folkman's theorem, a theorem in arithmetic combinatorics and Ramsey theory
- Shapley–Folkman lemma, a result in convex geometry
