= Higman's theorem =

Higman's theorem may refer to:

- Hall–Higman theorem in group theory, proved in 1956 by Philip Hall and Graham Higman
- Higman's embedding theorem in group theory, by Graham Higman

== See also ==
- Higman's lemma
