= Italo Jose Dejter =

Argentine-born American mathematician

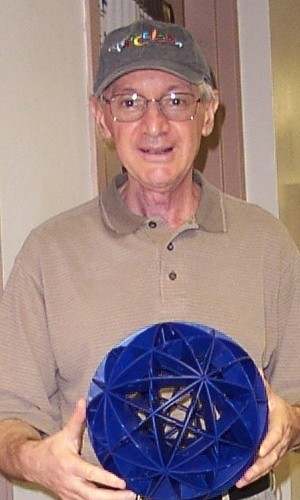
- Italo Jose Dejter
- Born: December 17, 1939 (age 86); Bahía Blanca, Argentina
- Education: University of Buenos Aires; Rutgers University
- Known for: Algebraic topology; Differential topology; Graph theory; Coding theory; Combinatorial designs
- Scientific career
- Fields: Mathematics; Computer science
- Workplaces: University of Puerto Rico, Río Piedras Campus
- Doctoral advisor: Ted Petrie

Italo Jose Dejter (December 17, 1939) is an Argentine-born American mathematician, a retired professor of mathematics and computer science from the University of Puerto Rico, (August 1984-February 2018) and a researcher in algebraic topology, differential topology, graph theory, coding theory and combinatorial designs. He obtained a Licentiate degree in mathematics from University of Buenos Aires in 1967, arrived at Rutgers University in 1970 by means of a Guggenheim Fellowship and obtained a Ph.D. degree in mathematics in 1975 under the supervision of Professor Ted Petrie, with support of the National Science Foundation. He was a professor at the Federal University of Santa Catarina, Brazil, from 1977 to 1984, with grants from the National Council for Scientific and Technological Development, (CNPq).

Dejter has been a visiting scholar at a number of research institutions, including University of São Paulo, Instituto Nacional de Matemática Pura e Aplicada, Federal University of Rio Grande do Sul, University of Cambridge, National Autonomous University of Mexico, Simon Fraser University, University of Victoria, New York University, University of Illinois at Urbana–Champaign, McMaster University, DIMACS, Autonomous University of Barcelona, Technical University of Denmark, Auburn University, Polytechnic University of Catalonia, Technical University of Madrid, Charles University, Ottawa University and Simón Bolívar University. The sections below describe the relevance of Dejter's work in the research areas mentioned in the first paragraph above, or in the adjacent box.

== Algebraic and differential topology ==
In 1971, Ted Petrie conjectured that if X is a closed, smooth 2n-dimensional homotopy complex projective space that admits a nontrivial smooth action of the circle, and if a function h, mapping X onto the 2n-dimensional complex projective space, is a homotopy equivalence, then h preserves the Pontrjagin classes. In 1975, Dejter proved Petrie's Conjecture for n=3, establishing this way that every closed, smooth, 6-dimensional homotopy complex projective space must be the complex 3-dimensional projective space CP^{3}. Dejter's result is most relevant in view of Petrie's exotic S^{1}-actions on CP^{3}, (apart from the trivial S^{1}-actions on CP^{3}).

Let G be a compact Lie group, let Y be a smooth G-manifold and let F a G-fibre map between G-vector bundles of the same dimension over Y which on each G-fibre is proper and has degree one. Petrie also asked: What are necessary and sufficient conditions for the existence of a smooth G-map properly G-homotopic to F and transverse to the zero-section? Dejter provided both types of conditions, which do not close to a necessary and sufficient condition due to a counterexample.

The main tool involved in establishing the results above by reducing differential-topology problems into algebraic-topology solutions is equivariant algebraic K-theory, where equivariance is understood with respect to the group given by the circle, i.e. the unit circle of the complex plane.

== Graph theory ==
=== Erdős–Pósa theorem and odd cycles ===
In 1962, Paul Erdős and Lajos Pósa proved that for every positive integer k there exists a positive integer k' such that for every graph G, either (i) G has k vertex-disjoint (long and/or even) cycles or (ii) there exists a subset X of less than k' vertices of G such that G \ X has no (long and/or even) cycles. This result, known today as the Erdős–Pósa theorem, cannot be extended to odd cycles. In fact, in 1987 Dejter and Víctor Neumann-Lara showed that given an integer k > 0, there exists a graph G not possessing disjoint odd cycles such that the number of vertices of G whose removal destroys all odd cycles of G is higher than k.

=== Ljubljana graph in binary 7-cube ===
In 1993, Brouwer, Dejter and Thomassen described an undirected, bipartite graph with 112 vertices and 168 edges, (semi-symmetric, that is edge-transitive but not vertex-transitive, cubic graph with diameter 8, radius 7, chromatic number 2, chromatic index 3, girth 10, with exactly 168 cycles of length 10 and 168 cycles of length 12), known since 2002 as the Ljubljana graph. They also established that the Dejter graph, obtained by deleting a copy of the Hamming code of length 7 from the binary 7-cube, admits a 3-factorization into two copies of the Ljubljana graph. See also. Moreover, relations of this subject with square-blocking subsets and with perfect dominating sets (see below) in hypercubes were addressed by Dejter et al. since 1991 in, and .

In fact, two questions were answered in, namely:

(a) How many colors are needed for a coloring of the n-cube without monochromatic 4-cycles or 6-cycles? Brouwer, Dejter and Thomassen showed that 4 colors suffice and thereby settle a problem of Erdős. (Independently found by F.R.K.Chung. Improving on this, Marston Conder in 1993 showed that for all n not less than 3 the edges of the n-cube can be 3-colored in such a way that there is no monochromatic 4-cycle or 6-cycle).

(b) Which vertex-transitive induced subgraphs does a hypercube have? The Dejter graph mentioned above is 6-regular, vertex-transitive and, as suggested, its edges can be 2-colored so that the two resulting monochromatic subgraphs are isomorphic to the semi-symmetric Ljubljana graph of girth 10.

In 1972, I. Z. Bouwer attributed a graph with the mentioned properties of the Ljubljana graph to R. M. Foster.

=== Coxeter graph and Klein graph ===
In 2012, Dejter showed that the 56-vertex Klein cubic graph F_{{56}}B, denoted here Γ', can be obtained from the 28-vertex Coxeter cubic graph Γ by zipping adequately the squares of the 24 7-cycles of Γ endowed with an orientation obtained by considering Γ as a ${\mathcal C}$-ultrahomogeneous digraph, where ${\mathcal C}$ is the collection formed both by the oriented 7-cycles and the 2-arcs that tightly fasten those oriented 7-cycles in Γ. In the process, it is seen that Γ' is a C'-ultrahomogeneous (undirected) graph, where C' is the collection formed by both the 7-cycles and the 1-paths that tightly fasten those 7-cycles in Γ'. This yields an embedding of Γ' into a 3-torus T_{3} which forms the Klein map of Coxeter notation (7,3)_{8}. The dual graph of Γ' in T_{3} is the distance-regular Klein quartic graph, with corresponding dual map of Coxeter notation (3,7)_{8}. Other aspects of this work are also cited in the following pages:

Bitangents of a quartic.
Coxeter graph.
Heawood graph.

In 2010, Dejter adapted the notion of ${\mathcal C}$-ultrahomogeneous graph for digraphs, and presented a strongly connected $\vec{C}_4$-ultrahomogeneous oriented graph on 168 vertices and 126 pairwise arc-disjoint 4-cycles with regular indegree and outdegree 3 and no circuits of lengths 2 and 3 by altering a definition of the Coxeter graph via pencils of ordered lines of the Fano plane in which pencils were replaced by ordered pencils.

The study of ultrahomogeneous graphs (respectively, digraphs) can be traced back to Sheehan, Gardiner, Ronse, Cameron, Gol'fand and Klin, (respectively, Fraïssé, Lachlan and Woodrow, Cherlin). See also page 77 in Bondy and Murty.

=== K_{d}-ultrahomogeneous configurations ===
Motivated in 2013 by the study of connected Menger graphs of self-dual 1-configurations (n_{d})_{1} expressible as K_{d}-ultrahomogeneous graphs, Dejter wondered for which values of n such graphs exist, as they would yield the most symmetrical, connected, edge-disjoint unions of n copies of K_{d} on n vertices in which the roles of vertices and copies of K_{d} are interchangeable. For d=4, known values of n are: n=13, 21 and n=42, This reference, by Dejter in 2009, yields a graph G for which each isomorphism between two of the 42 copies of K_{4} or two of the 21 copies of K_{2,2,2} in G extends to an automorphism of G. While it would be of interest to determine the spectrum and multiplicities of the involved values of n, Dejter contributes the value of n=102 via the Biggs-Smith association scheme (presented via sextets mod 17), shown to control attachment of 102 (cuboctahedral) copies of the line graph of the 3-cube to the 102 (tetrahedral) copies of K_{4}, these sharing each triangle with two copies of the cuboctahedral copies and guaranteeing that the distance 3-graph of the Biggs-Smith graph is the Menger graph of a self-dual 1-configuration (102_{4})_{1}. This result was obtained as an application of a transformation of distance-transitive graphs into C-UH graphs that yielded the above-mentioned paper and also allowed to confront, as digraphs, the Pappus graph to the Desargues graph.

These applications as well as the reference use the following definition. Given a family C of digraphs, a digraph G is said to be C-ultrahomogeneous if every isomorphism between two induced members of C in G extends to an automorphism of G. In, it is shown that exactly 7 distance-transitive cubic graphs among the existing 12 possess a particular ultrahomogeneous property with respect to oriented cycles realizing the girth that allows the construction of a related Cayley digraph with similar ultrahomogeneous properties in which those oriented cycles appear minimally "pulled apart", or "separated" and whose description is truly beautiful and insightful.

=== Hamiltonicity in graphs ===
In 1983, Dejter found that an equivalent condition for the existence of a Z_{4}-Hamilton cycle on the graph of chessknight moves of the usual type (1,2),(resp (1,4)) on the 2nx2n-board is that n is odd larger than 2, (resp. 4). These results are cited by I. Parberry, in relation to the algorithmic aspects of the knight's tour problem.

In 1985, Dejter presented a construction technique for Hamilton cycles in the middle-levels graphs. The existence of such cycles had been conjectured by I. Havel in 1983. and by M. Buck and D. Wiedemann in 1984, (though Béla Bollobás presented it to Dejter as a Paul Erdős' conjecture in Jan. 1983) and established by T. Mütze in 2014. That technique was used by Dejter et al.

In 2014, Dejter returned to this problem and established a canonical ordering of the vertices in a quotient graph (of each middle-levels graph under the action of a dihedral group) in one-to-one correspondence with an initial section of a system of numeration (present as sequence A239903 in the On-Line Encyclopedia of Integer Sequences by Neil Sloane) composed by restricted growth strings (with the k-th Catalan number expressed by means of the string 10...0 with k "zeros" and a single "one", as J. Arndt does in page 325) and related to Kierstead-Trotter lexical matching colors. This system of numeration may apply to a dihedral-symmetric restricted version of the middle-levels conjecture.

In 1988, Dejter showed that for any positive integer n, all 2-covering graphs of the complete graph K_{n} on n vertices can be determined; in addition, he showed that among them there is only one graph that is connected and has a maximal automorphism group, which happens to be bipartite; Dejter also showed that an i-covering graph of K_{n} is hamiltonian, for i less than 4, and that properly minimal connected non-hamiltonian covering graphs of K_{n} are obtained which are 4-coverings of K_{n}; also, non-hamiltonian connected 6-coverings of K_{n} were constructed in that work.

Also in 1988, Dejter showed that if k, n and q are integers such that if 0 <2k<n=2kq$\pm$1, then the graph generated by the generalized chessknight moves of type (1,2k) on the 2n x 2n-chessboard has Hamilton cycles invariant under quarter turns. For k=1, respectively 2, this extends to the following necessary and sufficient condition for the existence of such cycles: that n is odd and larger than 2k-1.

In 1990, Dejter showed that if n and r are integers larger than 0 with n+r larger than 2, then the difference of two concentric square boards A and B with (n + 2r)^{2} and n^{2} entries respectively has a chessknight Hamilton cycle invariant under quarter-turns if and only if r is larger than 2 and either n or r is odd.

In 1991, Dejter and Neumann-Lara showed that given a group Z_{n} acting freely on a graph G, the notion of a voltage graph is applied to the search for Hamilton cycles in G invariant under an action of Z_{n} on G. As an application, for n = 2 and 4, equivalent conditions and lower bounds for chessknight Hamilton cycles containing paths spanning square quadrants and rectangular half-boards were found, respectively.

=== Coloring the arcs of biregular graphs ===
Recalling that each edge of a graph H has two oppositely oriented arcs, each vertex v of H is identified with the set of arcs (v,e) departing from v along the edges e of H incident to v. Let H be a (λ,μ)-biregular graph with bipartition (Y,X), where |Y|=kμ and |X|=kλ, where k<0, λ and μ are integers. In, Dejter considered the problem of assigning, for each edge e=yx of H, a color given by an element of Y, respectively X, to the arc (y,e), respectively (x,e), so that each color is assigned exactly once in the set of arcs departing from each vertex of H. Furthermore, Dejter set such assignment to fulfill a specific bicolor weight function over a monotonic subset of Y×X, pointing that this problem applies to the Design of Experiments for Industrial Chemistry, Molecular Biology, Cellular Neuroscience, etc. An algorithmic construction based on biregular graphs with bipartitions given by cyclic-group pairs is also presented in Dejter's work, as well as three essentially different solutions to the Great Circle Challenge Puzzle based on a different biregular graph whose bipartition is formed by the vertices and 5-cycles of the Petersen graph.

== Perfect dominating sets ==
A perfect dominating set S of a graph G is a set of vertices of G such that every vertex of G is either in S or is adjacent to exactly one vertex of S. Weichsel showed that a perfect dominating set of the n-cube Q_{n} induces a subgraph of Q_{n} whose components are isomorphic to hypercubes and conjectured that each of these hypercubes has the same dimension. In 1993, Dejter and Weichsel presented the first known cases in which those components have the same dimension but different directions, namely in the 8-cube with components that are 1-cubes formed each by one edge, with the involved edges happening in:

(a) four different directions, as told by Alexander Felzenbaum to Weichsel in Rehovot, Israel, 1988;

(b) eight different directions, which involves the Hamming code of length 7, the Heawood graph, the Fano plane and the Steiner triple system of order 7.

The result of (a) above is immediately extended to perfect dominating sets in cubes of dimensions which are powers of 2 whose components contain each an only edge in half the coordinate direction. On the other hand, in 1991, Dejter and Phelps extended the result of (b) above again to cubes whose dimensions are powers of 2, with components composed each by a unique edge in all coordinate directions. (However, this result is not yet extended to q-ary cubes, as planned by the authors).

The Weichsel conjecture was answered in the affirmative by Östergård and Weakley, who found a perfect dominating set in the 13-cube whose components are 26 4-cubes and 288 isolated vertices. Dejter and Phelps gave a short and elegant proof of this result.

=== Efficient dominating sets ===
An E-chain is a countable family of nested graphs, each of which has an efficient dominating set. The Hamming codes in the n-cubes provide a classical example of E-chains. Dejter and Serra gave a constructing tool to produce E-chains of Cayley graphs. This tool was used to construct infinite families of E-chains of Cayley graphs generated by transposition trees of diameter 2 on symmetric groups. These graphs, known as star graphs, had the efficient domination property established by Arumugam and Kala. In contrast, Dejter and O. Tomaiconza showed that there is no efficient dominating set in any Cayley graph generated by a transposition tree of diameter 3. Further study on threaded distance trees and E-sets of star graphs was conducted by Dejter. In 2012, Dejter adapted the results cited above to the case of digraphs. In fact, worst-case efficient dominating sets in digraphs are conceived so that their presence in certain strong digraphs corresponds to that of efficient dominating sets in star graphs. The fact that the star graphs form a so-called dense segmental neighborly E-chain is reflected in a corresponding fact for digraphs.

=== Quasiperfect dominating sets ===
In 2009, Dejter defined a vertex subset S of a graph G as a quasiperfect dominating set in G if each vertex v of G not in S is adjacent to d_{v} ∈{1,2} vertices of S, and then investigated perfect and quasiperfect dominating sets in the regular tessellation graph of Schläfli symbol {3,6} and in its toroidal quotient graphs, yielding the classification of their perfect dominating sets and most of their quasiperfect dominating sets S with induced components of the form K_{ν}, where ν ∈{1,2,3} depends only on S.

== Coding theory ==
=== Invariants of perfect error-correcting codes ===
Invariants of perfect error-correcting codes were addressed by Dejter in, and Dejter and Delgado in which it is shown that a perfect 1-error-correcting code C is 'foldable' over its kernel via the Steiner triple systems associated to its codewords. The resulting 'folding' produces a graph invariant for C via Pasch configurations and tensors. Moreover, the invariant is complete for Vasil'ev codes of length 15 as viewed by F. Hergert, showing the existence of nonadditive propelinear 1-perfect codes, and allowing to visualize a propelinear code by means of the commutative group formed by its classes mod kernel, as well as to generalize the notion of a propelinear code by extending the involved composition of permutations to a more general group product.

=== Generalizing perfect Lee codes ===
Motivated by an application problem in computer architecture, Araujo, Dejter and Horak introduced a notion of perfect distance-dominating set, PDDS, in a graph, constituting a generalization of perfect Lee codes, diameter perfect codes, and other codes and dominating sets, and thus initiating a systematic study of such vertex sets. Some of these sets, related to the motivating application, were constructed, and the non-existence of others was demonstrated. In fact, an extension of the long-standing Golomb-Welch Conjecture, in terms of PDDSs, was stated.

=== Total perfect codes ===
According to Dejter and Delgado, given a vertex subset S' of a side P_{m} of an m x n grid graph G, the perfect dominating sets S in G with S' being the intersection of S with V(P_{m}) can be determined via an exhaustive algorithm of running time O(2^{m+n}). Extending the algorithm to infinite-grid graphs of width m-1, periodicity makes the binary decision tree prunable into a finite threaded tree, a closed walk of which yields all such sets S. The graphs induced by the complements of such sets S can be codified by arrays of ordered pairs of positive integers, for the growth and determination of which a speedier algorithm exists. A recent characterization of grid graphs having total perfect codes S (i.e. with just 1-cubes as induced components, also called 1-PDDS and DPL(2,4)), due to Klostermeyer and Goldwasser, allowed Dejter and Delgado to show that these sets S are restrictions of only one total perfect code S_{1} in the planar integer lattice graph, with the extra-bonus that the complement of S_{1} yields an aperiodic tiling, like the Penrose tiling. In contrast, the parallel, horizontal, total perfect codes in the planar integer lattice graph are in 1-1 correspondence with the doubly infinite {0,1}-sequences.

Dejter showed that there is an uncountable number of parallel total perfect codes in the planar integer lattice graph L; in contrast, there is just one 1-perfect code, and just one total perfect code in L, the latter code restricting to total perfect codes of rectangular grid graphs (which yields an asymmetric, Penrose, tiling of the plane); in particular, Dejter characterized all cycle products C_{m} x C_{n} containing parallel total perfect codes, and the d-perfect and total perfect code partitions of L and C_{m} x C_{n}, the former having as quotient graph the undirected Cayley graphs of the cyclic group of order 2d^{2}+2d+1 with generator set {1,2d^{2}}.

In 2012, Araujo and Dejter made a conjecturing contribution to the classification of lattice-like total perfect codes in n-dimensional integer lattices via pairs (G,F) formed by abelian groups G and homomorphisms F from Z^{n} onto G, in the line of the Araujo-Dejter-Horak work cited above.

== Combinatorial designs ==
Since 1994, Dejter intervened in several projects in Combinatorial Designs initially suggested by Alexander Rosa, C. C. Lindner and C. A. Rodger and also worked upon with E. Mendelsohn, F. Franek, D. Pike, P. A. Adams, E. J. Billington, D. G. Hoffman, M. Meszka and others, which produced results in the following subjects:

Invariants for 2-factorization and cycle systems,

Triangles in 2-factorizations,

Number of 4-cycles in 2-factorizations of complete graphs,

Directed almost resolvable Hamilton-Waterloo problem,

Number of 4-cycles in 2-factorizations of K_{2n} minus a 1-factor,

Almost resolvable 4-cycle systems,

Critical sets for the completion of Latin squares

Almost resolvable maximum packings of complete graphs with 4-cycles.
