= Moldovan Americans =

Americans of Moldovan birth or descent

Total population
- 7,859, including 7,156 first ancestry and 703 second ancestry (Moldovan ancestry, 2000 US Census); 55,977 (Moldovan-born, 2022 American Community Survey)

Regions with significant populations
- Asheville (North Carolina), New York City (New York), Washington, D.C., Sacramento (California), Seattle, Tacoma (Washington), Chicago (Illinois)

Languages
- Romanian, American English, Russian

Religion
- Eastern Orthodoxy, Judaism

Related ethnic groups
- Romanian Americans

Moldovan Americans are Americans who are from Moldova or are descended from Moldovans. According to the U.S. 2000 census, there were 7,859 Moldovan Americans in the United States. The American Community Survey indicated that the number born in Moldova greatly increased over the years, and in 2014 exceeded 40,000 people in the United States. Most Moldovan Americans are Eastern Orthodox.

== Demographics ==
In the 2010 U.S. census and subsequently, the largest part of the population born in Moldova self-identified as being of Romanian ancestry. The 2021 U.S. Census Bureau Estimate of the number of people born in Moldova was 52,107. The 2021 U.S. Census Bureau estimate results based on population surveys show 26,921 people born in the Republic of Moldova (51.66%) who identified themselves as being of "Romanian ancestry". The 2015 U.S. Census Bureau Estimate of the number of people born in Moldova was 43,564. The 2015 U.S. Census Bureau estimate results based on population surveys show 20,128 people born in the Republic of Moldova (46.20%) who identified themselves as being of "Romanian ancestry". By contrast, 131,323 individuals who declared a Romanian ancestry were born in Romania and 1,438 in Ukraine. The number of self-identified ethnic Moldovans in the United States has recently not been listed by the U.S. Census Bureau because it has been seen as too low; it was lower than that of the 8,500 Carpatho-Rusyns, who were listed in 2021.

However, many other Moldovan-born people were of other ancestries. In 2015, 7,968 of them declared themselves to be of "Russian ancestry", probably including some Russian-speaking Jews, 3,747 declared themselves to be of Ukrainian ancestry, 332 declared themselves to be of Bulgarian ancestry, and 126 declared themselves to be of Turkish ancestry (mainly Gagauz). No inhabitants of the U.S. declared a Gagauz ancestry in the 2020 census. The number of people originating from Moldova who indicated Polish ancestry was 228, while 126 declared German ancestry, 43 declared Israeli ancestry, and 196 declared "European" ancestry. In 2021, out of 52,107 individuals born in the Republic of Moldova living in the United States, 26,921 (51.66%) declared a Romanian ancestry, 8,155 (15.65%) declared a Russian ancestry, 5,058 (9.71%) declared a Ukrainian ancestry, 321 (0.62%) declared a Bulgarian ancestry and 152 (0.29%) a Turkish ancestry (mainly Gagauz). The number of people from Moldova who indicated an Israeli ancestry was 23, while 437 declared a Polish ancestry, 167 a German ancestry and 468 a "European" ancestry.

Moldovan communities exist in cities such as Asheville, New York, Washington, D.C., Chicago and Seattle. Moldovans have Moldovan food restaurants in the United States, in places such as New York City.

In 2000, according to the U.S. Bureau, there were 7,859 people of Moldovan ancestry, regardless of their place of birth, including 7,156 first ancestry and 703 second ancestry self-identified Moldovans; the number was no longer reported subsequently because it was below the numerical threshold for the public reporting of the ancestry groups.

Most Moldovan Americans are Eastern Orthodox, and attend overwhelmingly ethnic Romanian parishes of the Orthodox Church of America.

== Statistics ==
Moldova-born population in the US since 2010:

| Year | Number |
|---|---|
| 2010 | 33,659 |
| 2011 | ▲34,152 |
| 2012 | ▲41,340 |
| 2013 | ▼34,913 |
| 2014 | ▲41,193 |
| 2015 | ▲43,564 |
| 2016 | ▼42,403 |
| 2017 | ▲47,156 |
| 2018 | ▲47,767 |
| 2019 | ▼46,388 |
| 2020 | ▲48,216 |
| 2021 | ▲60,097 |
| 2022 | ▼55,977 |

According to estimates from the Migration Policy Institute website for 2017–2021, the population of immigrants from Moldova in the USA was 52,100. The top counties of settlement were as follows:

1) Sacramento County, California – 5,400

2) Brooklyn Borough, NYC, New York – 4,100

3) Cook County, Illinois – 2,100

4) King County, Washington – 2,000

5) Los Angeles County, California – 1,600

6) Pierce County, Washington – 1,400

== Associations ==
Several Moldovan associations can be found in the United States, such as the "Moldova for Democracy and Development" and "Grigore Vieru" organizations in Brooklyn, New York. Another important Moldovan association is "The Moldova Foundation", a non-profit organization established in Washington, D.C. in 2003, whose main goal is to support people in Moldova and to encourage them to establish economic reforms and a democratic system in the country (which would include "freedom of speech, pluralism and private initiative"), through support of the United States and the European Union.

== Notable people ==
- Roman Borvanov
- George de Bothezat
- Xenia Deli
- Veronica Dragalin
- Daniella Karagach
- Aleksandr Kogan
- Isaak Shvartsev
- Max Vangeli
- Sam Zemurray
- Jonathan Cheban
- Bianna Golodryga
- Valery Gaina

=== Moldovan-Jewish ===
Notable Americans of Moldovan-Jewish descent.

- Boris Anisfeld
- Samuel Bronston
- Italo Jose Dejter
- Jared Diamond
- Ari Emanuel
- Ezekiel Emanuel
- Rahm Emanuel
- Ed Feingersh
- Louis Filler
- George Finkel
- Maurice Herman Finkel
- William F. Friedman
- Prince Alexander von Fürstenberg
- Diane von Fürstenberg
- Princess Tatiana von Fürstenberg
- Ben Gold
- Bianna Golodryga
- Frederick Irving
- Mona May Karff
- Boris Kolker
- Lee Krasner
- Lewis Milestone
- Saul Perlmutter
- Steven Pinker
- Vera Rubin
- Morris Swadesh
- Orly Taitz
- Henry Waxman
- Maria Winetzkaja
- Sam Zemurray

== See also ==
- North Carolina–Moldova National Guard Partnership
- Moldova–United States relations
- Romanian Americans
