= Ljubljana graph =

Undirected bipartite graph with 112 vertices and 168 edges

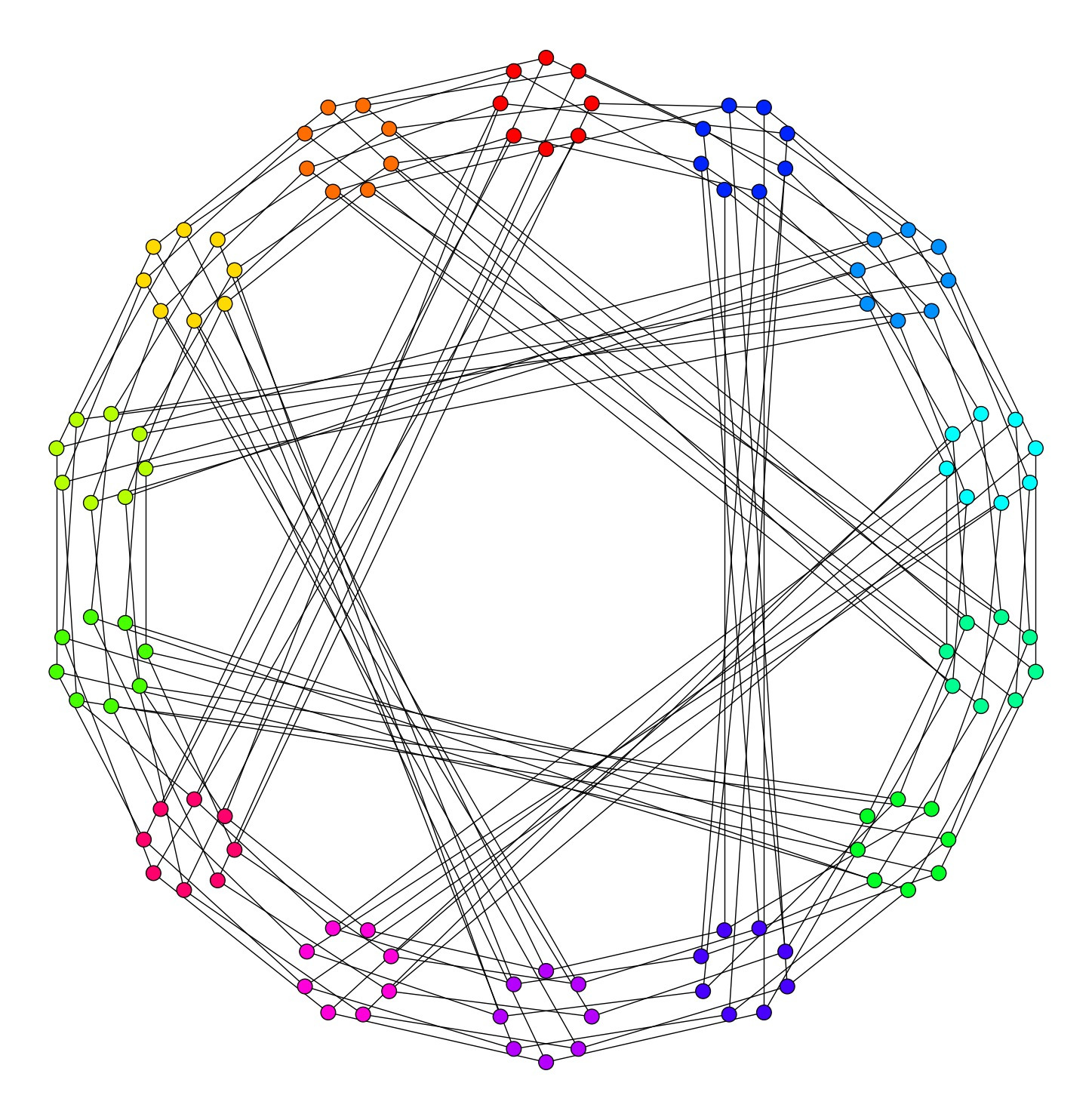
- The Ljubljana graph as a covering graph of the Heawood graph
- Vertices: 112
- Edges: 168
- Radius: 7
- Diameter: 8
- Girth: 10
- Automorphisms: 168
- Chromatic number: 2
- Chromatic index: 3
- Properties: Cubic; Semi-symmetric; Hamiltonian

In the mathematical field of graph theory, the Ljubljana graph is an undirected bipartite graph with 112 vertices and 168 edges, rediscovered in 2002 and named after Ljubljana (the capital of Slovenia).

It is a cubic graph with diameter 8, radius 7, chromatic number 2 and chromatic index 3. Its girth is 10 and there are exactly 168 cycles of length 10 in it. There are also 168 cycles of length 12.

== Construction ==
The Ljubljana graph is Hamiltonian and can be constructed from the LCF notation : [47, −23, −31, 39, 25, −21, −31, −41, 25, 15, 29, −41, −19, 15, −49, 33, 39, −35, −21, 17, −33, 49, 41, 31, −15, −29, 41, 31, −15, −25, 21, 31, −51, −25, 23, 9, −17, 51, 35, −29, 21, −51, −39, 33, −9, −51, 51, −47, −33, 19, 51, −21, 29, 21, −31, −39]^{2}.

The Ljubljana graph is the Levi graph of the Ljubljana configuration, a quadrangle-free configuration with 56 lines and 56 points. In this configuration, each line contains exactly 3 points, each point belongs to exactly 3 lines and any two lines intersect in at most one point.

== Algebraic properties ==
The automorphism group of the Ljubljana graph is a group of order 168. It acts transitively on the edges the graph but not on its vertices: there are symmetries taking every edge to any other edge, but not taking every vertex to any other vertex. Therefore, the Ljubljana graph is a semi-symmetric graph, the third smallest possible cubic semi-symmetric graph after the Gray graph on 54 vertices and the Iofinova-Ivanov graph on 110 vertices.

The characteristic polynomial of the Ljubljana graph is

$$(x-3)x^{14}(x+3)(x^2-x-4)^7(x^2-2)^6(x^2+x-4)^7(x^4-6x^2+4)^{14}.\$$

== History ==
The Ljubljana graph was first published in 1993 by Brouwer, Dejter and Thomassen as a self-complementary subgraph of the Dejter graph.

In 1972, Bouwer was already talking of a 112-vertices edge- but not vertex-transitive cubic graph found by R. M. Foster, nonetheless unpublished. Conder, Malnič, Marušič, Pisanski and Potočnik rediscovered this 112-vertices graph in 2002 and named it the Ljubljana graph after the capital of Slovenia. They proved that it was the unique 112-vertices edge- but not vertex-transitive cubic graph and therefore that was the graph found by Foster.

== Gallery ==
The Ljubljana graph is Hamiltonian and bipartite

The chromatic index of the Ljubljana graph is 3.

Alternative drawing of the Ljubljana graph.

The Ljubljana graph is the Levi graph of this configuration.
