= Marion Cameron Gray =

Scottish mathematician (1902–1979)

Marion Gray
- Born: 26 March 1902; Ayr, Scotland
- Died: 16 September 1979 (aged 77); Edinburgh, Scotland
- Education: University of Edinburgh; Bryn Mawr College
- Known for: Gray graph
- Scientific career
- Fields: Mathematics
- Workplaces: University of Edinburgh; Bryn Mawr College; Imperial College; American Telephone & Telegraph
- Thesis: A boundary value problem of ordinary self-adjoint differential equations with singularities (1926)
- Doctoral advisor: Anna Johnson Pell Wheeler

Marion Gray (26 March 1902 – 16 September 1979) was a Scottish mathematician who discovered a graph with 54 vertices and 81 edges while working at American Telephone & Telegraph. The graph is commonly known as the Gray graph.

== Early life and education ==
Marion Gray was born in Ayr, Scotland on 26 March 1902 to Marion (née Cameron) and James Gray. She attended Ayr Grammar School (1907–1913) and Ayr Academy (1913–1919). In 1919 she entered the University of Edinburgh where she graduated in 1922 with a first class honours in mathematics and natural philosophy. She continued on at the University for a further two years as a post doctoral student in mathematics where she was supervised by E.T. Whittaker. She joined the Edinburgh Mathematical Society where she presented several of her papers including 'The equation of telegraphy' and 'The equation of conduction of heat'. She was elected to the Committee of the Society in November 1923 and continued as a member throughout her career.

In 1924 she travelled to the United States under the assistance of both a British graduates scholarship and a Carnegie scholarship to attend Bryn Mawr College, Pennsylvania from where she gained a PhD under the supervision of Anna Johnson Pell Wheeler. Her research topic was 'A boundary value problem of ordinary self-adjoint differential equations with singularities'.

After receiving her doctorate Gray returned to Edinburgh to take a post of university assistant in natural philosophy at the University of Edinburgh. She held the post for one year before going to London where she was an assistant in mathematics at Imperial College for three years.

== Employment and the Gray graph ==
The Gray graph, arranged to show its construction from a 3d grid

In 1930 she was appointed to the post of assistant engineer at the Department of Development and Research of the American Telephone and Telegraph Company in New York. While working there she discovered an unusual cubic semi-symmetric graph with 54 vertices, representing the 27 points and 27 lines in a 3 × 3 × 3 three-dimensional grid, with an edge for each pair of a point and a line that meet each other. Here, "cubic" means that each vertex is the endpoint of three edges, and "semi-symmetric" means that every two edges are symmetric to each other but the same is not true for the vertices. This graph is the smallest possible cubic semi-symmetric graph. Thinking it was a theoretical discovery without practical application Gray did not publish her findings. Thirty-six years later, I. Z. Bouwer rediscovered and described the graph and explained how it could answer questions regarding types of symmetry. The graph is commonly known as the Gray graph.

In 1934 Gray joined Bell Telephone Laboratories and remained with the company for a further 30 years until her retirement.

Erich O. Schulz-DuBois, who was assisted by Gray on his 1959 paper, Paramagnetic spectra of substituted sapphires, called Gray "one of Bell's finest mathematicians at that time".

As well as her own research articles Gray compiled many reviews of publications on mathematical physics and served on the US Government-related committee which produced the Handbook of Mathematical Functions. She remained an active member of various professional mathematical societies throughout her career.

== Later life ==
After her retirement in 1967 Gray moved back to Edinburgh where she died in 1979 aged 77 years.

== Recognition ==
Gray was included in the National Library of Scotland's display "Celebrating Scottish women of science" which ran from 1 March to 30 April 2013.
