= Quartic graph =

Graph with all vertices of degree 4

In the mathematical field of graph theory, a quartic graph is a graph where all vertices have degree 4. In other words, a quartic graph is a 4-regular graph.

== Examples ==
The Chvátal graph

Several well-known graphs are quartic. They include:

- The complete graph $K_5$, a quartic graph with 5 vertices, is the smallest possible quartic graph.
- The octahedral graph $K_{2,2,2}$, the graph of the regular octahedron, has 6 vertices.
- The Chvátal graph, another quartic graph with 12 vertices, is the smallest quartic graph that both has no triangles and cannot be colored with three colors.
- The Folkman graph, a quartic graph with 20 vertices, is the smallest semi-symmetric graph. This means that it has symmetries taking every two edges to each other, but does not have symmetries taking every two vertices to each other.
- The Meredith graph, a quartic graph with 70 vertices, is 4-connected but has no Hamiltonian cycle, disproving a conjecture of Crispin Nash-Williams.

Every medial graph is a quartic plane graph, and every quartic plane graph is the medial graph of a pair of dual plane graphs or multigraphs. Knot diagrams and link diagrams are also quartic plane multigraphs, in which the vertices represent the crossings of the diagram and are marked with additional information concerning which of the two branches of the knot crosses the other branch at that point. The line graph of any cubic graph is quartic; the cuboctahedral graph is an example, as the line graph of a cube graph.

The subdivided double of a quartic graph is another, larger, quartic graph. It is obtained by subdividing each edge of the given graph into a two-edge path, and then replacing each vertex that came from the given graph by a pair of vertices, both adjacent to the same neighborhood of subdivision vertices. For instance, the Folkman graph is the subdivided double of the complete graph $K_5$.

== Properties ==
Because the degree of every vertex in a quartic graph is even, every connected quartic graph has an Euler tour. And as with regular bipartite graphs more generally, every bipartite quartic graph has a perfect matching. In this case, a much simpler and faster algorithm for finding such a matching is possible than for irregular graphs: by selecting every other edge of an Euler tour, one may find a 2-factor, which in this case must be a collection of cycles, each of even length, with each vertex of the graph appearing in exactly one cycle. By selecting every other edge again in these cycles, one obtains a perfect matching in linear time. The same method can also be used to color the edges of the graph with four colors in linear time.

Quartic graphs have an even number of Hamiltonian decompositions.

== Open problems ==
It is an open conjecture whether all quartic Hamiltonian graphs have an even number of Hamiltonian circuits, or have more than one Hamiltonian circuit. The answer is known to be false for quartic multigraphs.

== See also ==
- Cubic graph
