= Oxford University Invariant Society =

- Abbreviation: The Invariants
- Type: Student organisation
- Purpose: Education
- Headquarters: Mathematical Institute, Oxford
- Location: Oxford, UK
- Official language: English
- Website: www.invariants.org.uk

The Oxford University Invariant Society, or 'The Invariants', is a university society open to members of the University of Oxford, dedicated to promotion of interest in mathematics. The society regularly hosts talks from professional mathematicians on topics both technical and more popular, from the mathematics of juggling to the history of mathematics. Many prominent British mathematicians were members of the society during their time at Oxford.

== History ==
The Society was founded in 1936 by J. H. C. Whitehead together with two of his students at Balliol College, Graham Higman and Jack de Wet. The name of the society was chosen at random by Higman from the titles of the books on Whitehead's shelf; in this case, Oswald Veblen's Invariants of Quadratic Differential Forms. The opening lecture was given by G. H. Hardy in Hilary Term 1936, with the title 'Round Numbers'.

Though many members joined the armed forces during the war, meetings continued, including lectures by Douglas Hartree and Max Newman, as well as debates - 'Is Mathematics an end in itself?' - and mathematical films.

The society has hosted hundreds of prominent mathematicians, including lectures by Benoit Mandelbrot, Sir Roger Penrose, and Simon Singh.

Since 1961, the Society has published a magazine entitled The Invariant.
