= Rosemary A. Bailey =

British statistician and algebraist

- Born: 1947 (age 78–79)
- Citizenship: British
- Education: University of Oxford, UK
- Scientific career
- Fields: Design of experiments, analysis of variance, combinatorics, finite group theory
- Workplaces: School of Mathematics and Statistics, University of St Andrews, UK
- Thesis: Finite Permutation Groups (1974)
- Doctoral advisor: Graham Higman
- Website: rabailey23.github.io/web/

Rosemary A. Bailey FRSE (born 1947) is a British statistician who works in the design of experiments and the analysis of variance and in related areas of combinatorial design, especially in association schemes. She has written books on the design of experiments, on association schemes, and on linear models in statistics.

== Education and career ==
Bailey's first degree and D.Phil. were in mathematics at the University of Oxford. After her first degree, Bailey did a year of Voluntary Service Overseas, teaching Mathematics and French at a school in Ilorin, Nigeria.

She was awarded her doctorate in 1974 for a dissertation on permutation groups, Finite Permutation Groups supervised by Graham Higman. Bailey's career has not been in pure mathematics but in statistics where she has specialised in the algebraic problems associated with the design of experiments.

Bailey worked at The Open University before becoming a Post-Doctoral Fellow at the University of Edinburgh with Desmond Patterson. She spent 1981–91 in the Statistics Department of Rothamsted Experimental Station. In 1991 Bailey became Professor of Mathematical Sciences at Goldsmiths College in the University of London and then Professor of Statistics at Queen Mary, University of London where she is Professor Emerita of Statistics. After 12 years as Professor of Mathematics and Statistics in the School of Mathematics and Statistics at the University of St Andrews, Scotland, she is currently Professor Emeritus there.

== Recognition ==
Bailey is a Fellow of the Institute of Mathematical Statistics and in 2015 was elected a Fellow of the Royal Society of Edinburgh.

== Selected publications ==
- Bailey, R. A. (2004). Association Schemes: Designed Experiments, Algebra and Combinatorics. Cambridge: Cambridge University Press. ISBN 978-0-521-82446-0.
- Bailey, R. A. (2008). Design of Comparative Experiments. Cambridge: Cambridge University Press. ISBN 978-0-521-68357-9.
- Speed, T. P.; Bailey, R. A. (1987). "Factorial Dispersion Models". International Statistical Review / Revue Internationale de Statistique. 55 (3). International Statistical Institute (ISI): 261–277. doi:10.2307/1403405. JSTOR 1403405.
- Bailey, R. A.; Cameron, Peter J.; Praeger, Cheryl E.; Schneider, Csaba (2022). "The geometry of diagonal groups". Transactions of the American Mathematical Society. 375. American Mathematical Society: 5259–5311. arXiv:2007.10726. doi:10.1090/tran/8507.
