= Journal of Graph Theory =

- Discipline: Mathematics
- Language: English
- Edited by: Paul Seymour, Carsten Thomassen

Publication details
- History: 1977-present
- Publisher: John Wiley & Sons
- Frequency: Monthly
- Impact factor: 0.857 (2020)

Standard abbreviations
- ISO 4: J. Graph Theory

Indexing
- CODEN: JGTHDO
- ISSN: 0364-9024 (print); 1097-0118 (web)
- OCLC no.: 3057169

Links
- Journal homepage; Online access; Online archive

The Journal of Graph Theory is a peer-reviewed mathematics journal specializing in graph theory and related areas, such as structural results about graphs, graph algorithms with theoretical emphasis, and discrete optimization on graphs.

The scope of the journal also includes related areas in combinatorics and the interaction of graph theory with other mathematical sciences. It is published by John Wiley & Sons. The journal was established in 1977 by Frank Harary. The editors-in-chief are Paul Seymour (Princeton University) and Carsten Thomassen (Technical University of Denmark).

== Abstracting and indexing ==
The journal is abstracted and indexed in the Science Citation Index Expanded, Scopus, and Zentralblatt MATH. According to the Journal Citation Reports, the journal has a 2020 impact factor of 0.857.
