= Bianna Golodryga =

American journalist (born 1978)

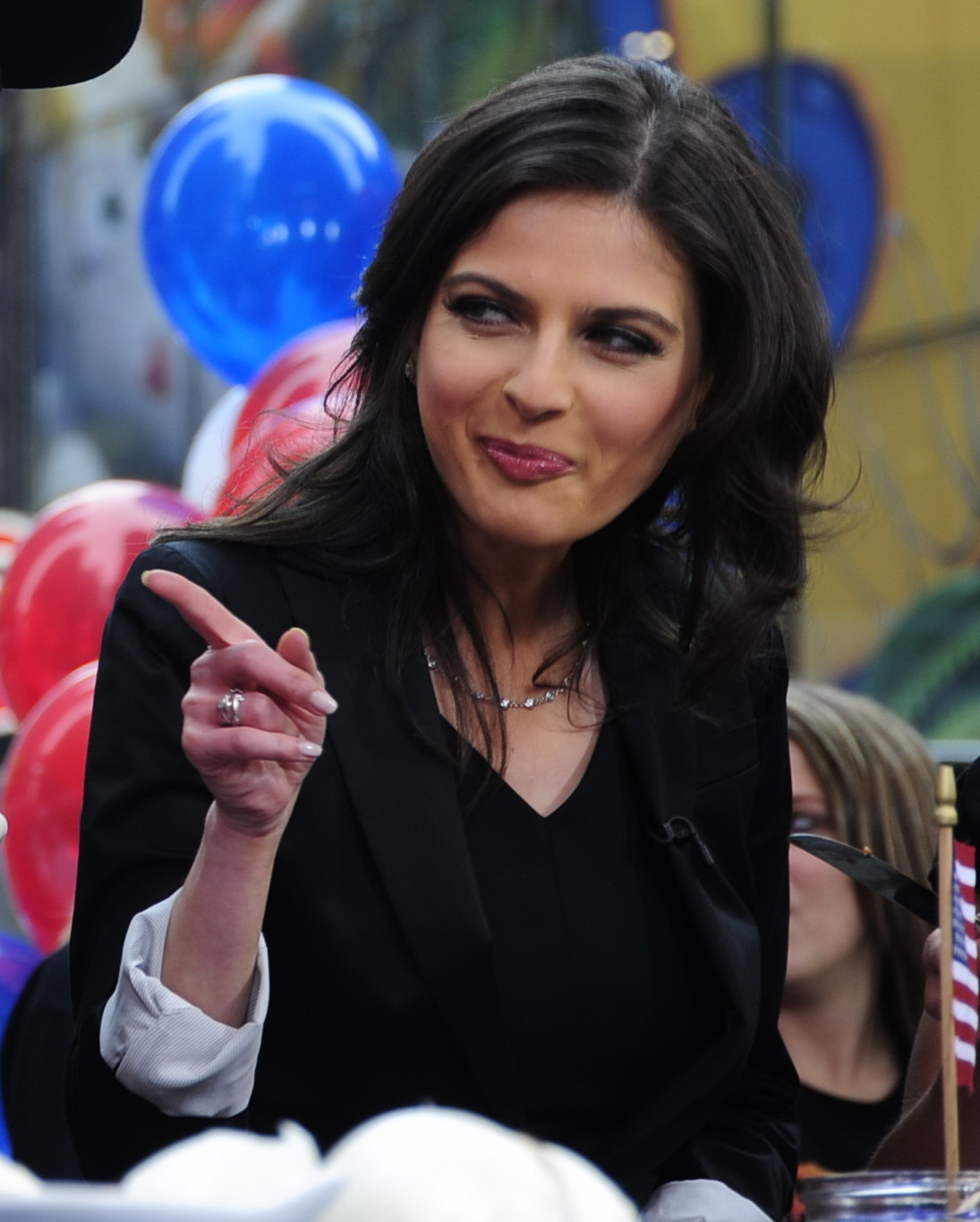
- Golodryga in 2010
- Born: Bianna Vitalievna Golodryga; June 15, 1978 (age 48); Căușeni District, Moldavian SSR, Soviet Union (now Moldova)
- Education: University of Texas at Austin
- Occupations: News anchor; journalist
- Years active: 2000–present
- Notable credits: CNBC; ABC; Yahoo! News; MSNBC; CBS; CNN; CNN International
- Spouse: Peter R. Orszag (m. 2010)
- Children: 2
- Website: biannagolodryga.com

Bianna Vitalievna Golodryga (Russian: Бианна Витальевна Голодрыга; born June 15, 1978) is a Moldavian-born American news anchor and journalist. She co-anchored One World with Zain Asher on CNN International. She previously served as a senior global affairs analyst at CNN, and as news and finance anchor at Yahoo! News. Golodryga also co-anchored the weekend edition of Good Morning America and co-hosted CBS This Morning.

== Early life and education ==
Golodryga was born to Moldovan Jewish parents in the Căușeni District, Soviet Moldova.

In 1980, when she was 18 months old, her family left the Soviet Union as political refugees, with $150 in their pocket. Arriving in the United States, they initially moved to Galveston, Texas, before settling in nearby Houston. Since then, she has returned to her birthplace only once, when she visited her grandparents and cousins in 1988; her grandmother joined her family in Houston later that year. Her mother Zhanna is the chief digital and administrative officer for Phillips 66, and previously was the chief information officer of Hess Corporation. Her father Vitaly, a mechanical engineer, was a consultant for DuPont.

Golodryga attended the High School for the Performing and Visual Arts in Houston, but chose journalism over an acting career. She was inspired to look more closely at what was going on in the world after performing in a play about AIDS, written by her teacher Sharon Ferranti, whom she cites as a major source of inspiration.

Golodryga is fluent in the Russian language and graduated from the University of Texas at Austin with a degree in Russian/East European and Eurasian studies and a minor in economics in May 2000.

== Career ==
Golodryga had planned for a career in the financial services industry after she graduated from college. She became a licensed trader and worked at several financial companies. After a sharp drop in the market, however, she decided to pursue journalism. She moved to New York in February 2001 and began working as a producer at CNBC, where she later became an on-air correspondent.

In 2004, Golodryga was named one of the top journalists under the age of 30. She was a correspondent for ABC between 2007 and 2010, and was named co-anchor of the weekend edition of Good Morning America in May 2010, following the departure of former co-anchor Kate Snow, who went to work for NBC.

In April 2013, Golodryga was the first person to interview Anzor Tsarnaev, the father of Tamerlan Tsarnaev and Dzhokhar Tsarnaev, who both carried out the Boston Marathon bombings; she called this "the most emotional moment" of her career. At first she assisted her colleagues with the proper pronunciation of the name; her assignment was to call Anzor in Chechnya. He had very few details to offer but called her back the next day, trying to find more information about what was happening and whether or not Dzhokhar, who had been taken into custody severely injured, was still alive.

Golodryga served as weekend co-anchor of Good Morning America until August 4, 2014, when she left the program to join the business and finance news department of Yahoo! News. She was a guest host on Way Too Early and was a regular contributor to Morning Joe on MSNBC. In 2017, she was a guest co-anchor on CBS Morning News. She joined CBS on a permanent basis as a correspondent in September 2017 and simultaneously joined CNN as a contributor.

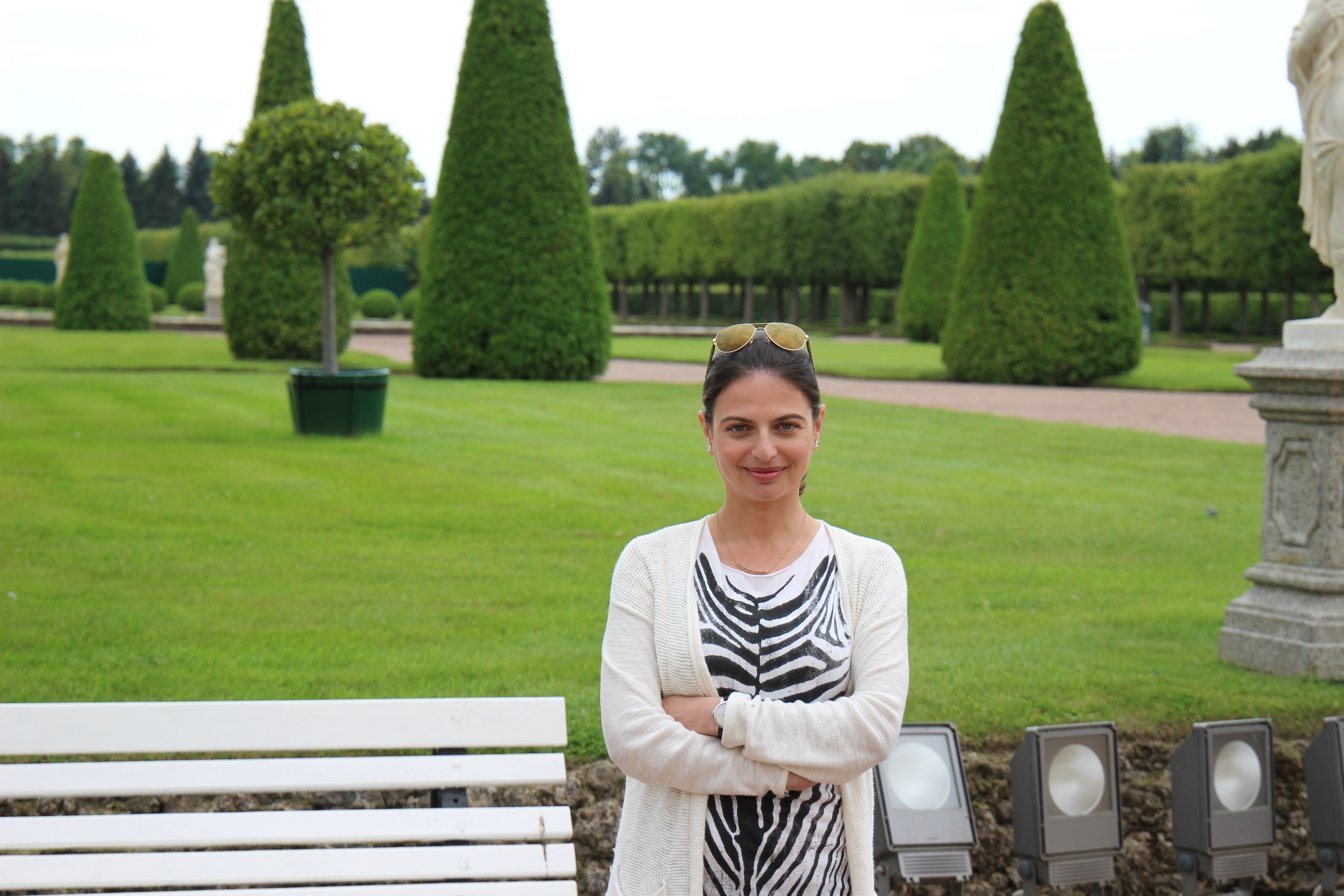
Golodryga traveling in Europe, 2015

In December 2016, Golodryga confronted Republican then-Congressman Dana Rohrabacher over his defense of Russian president Vladimir Putin. At the time, Rohrabacher was considered a candidate to be appointed Secretary of State by American president-elect Donald Trump and was criticizing China for its record on human rights. Golodryga then asked about Putin, who has been consistently praised by Trump. Rohrabacher answered, "Oh, baloney. Where do you come from? How can you say that?" to which Golodryga replied, "I come from the former Soviet Union—that's where I came from. I came here as a political refugee. That's where I came from." Rohrabacher appeared flustered and accused Golodryga of being biased before he compared Putin to Mikhail Gorbachev.

Golodryga is a member of the Council on Foreign Relations. She has contributed to the HuffPost, and more recently was a news and finance anchor at Yahoo!.

In 2015, Golodryga, whose husband was a former Bill Clinton staff member, was selected by Hillary Clinton to conduct Hillary's first interview as a presidential candidate. However, Hillary Clinton said her choice was "Bianna", which was misinterpreted by Hillary's staff as "Brianna" and an interview was scheduled with CNN's Brianna Keilar, who conducted a tough interview. Golodryga responded, "It happens all the time that my name gets butchered. I never thought it would impede me from participating in what would be one of the biggest stories of my life."

On October 3, 2018, it was announced on CBS This Morning that she would be joining the team as a co-host. On April 3, 2019, CBS News announced that she had chosen to leave the network after being removed from her co-host position. Later that year, CNN announced that Golodryga had accepted a full-time role at the network as a senior global affairs analyst.

Amidst the 2021 Israel–Palestine crisis, Golodryga interviewed Shah Mahmood Qureshi, the erstwhile Pakistani Minister of Foreign Affairs. During the interview, Qureshi said: "Israel is losing out. They are losing the media war, despite their connections." Golodryga asked Qureshi: "What are their connections?" to which Qureshi replied: "Deep pockets," adding, "they are very influential people, they control media." Golodryga remarked several times during the interview that she considered this remark to be antisemitic. After her exchange with Qureshi became a matter of international discussion, she elaborated further: "There should be zero point zero doubt that accusing Israel of 'controlling the media' and having 'deep pockets' is anti-Semitic." Since the interview, Pakistani government officials and social media commentators have defended Qureshi's remarks.

In August 2025, she and Israeli news anchor Yonit Levi published a children's book, Don't Feed the Lion, about antisemitism.

On October 23, 2026, Golodryga announced that she would exit CNN on her last day on One World.

== Awards ==
Golodgryga is a recipient of an Emmy Award for Outstanding Morning Program, the Keystone Policy Center Leadership Award and the University of Texas at Austin Pro Bene Meritis Award among others.

== Personal life ==
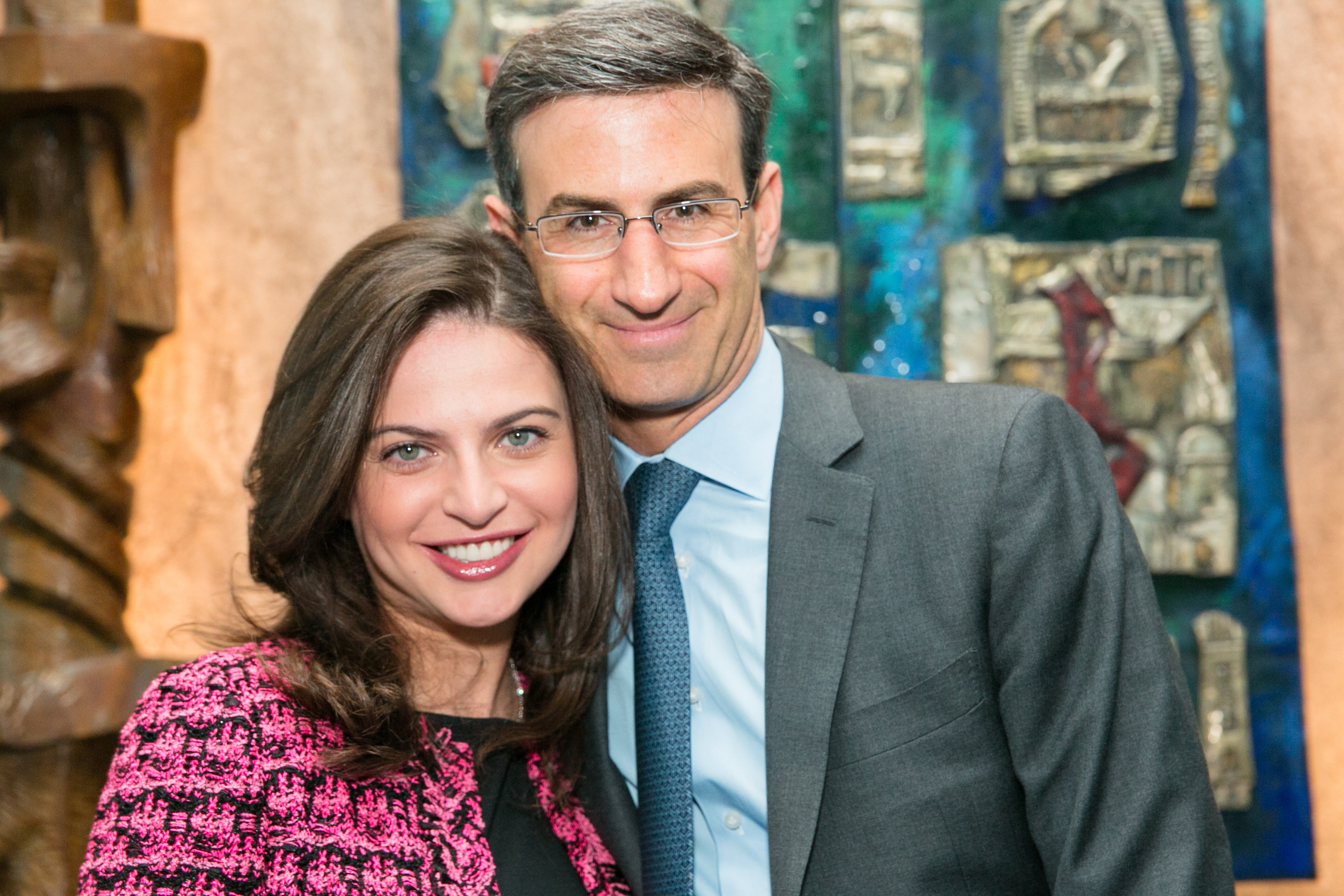
Golodryga and her husband, Peter R. Orszag, in 2018

In September 2010, Golodryga married Peter R. Orszag, the CEO of Lazard, a financial services firm, and the former Director of the Office of Management and Budget during the Barack Obama administration. They have a son and daughter.

== See also ==
- New Yorkers in journalism
- Moldovan-Jewish Americans
