= Dejter graph =

- Vertices: 112
- Edges: 336
- Radius: 7
- Diameter: 7
- Girth: 4
- Automorphisms: 2688

Red Ljubljana subgraph

Blue Ljubljana subgraph

One seventh of the Dejter graph

In the mathematical field of graph theory, the Dejter graph is a 6-regular graph with 112 vertices and 336 edges. The Dejter graph is obtained by deleting a copy of the Hamming code of length 7 from the binary 7-cube.

The Dejter graph, and by extension any graph obtained by deleting a Hamming code of length 2^{r}-1 from a (2^{r}-1)-cube, is a symmetric graph. In particular, the Dejter graph admits a 3-factorization into two copies of the Ljubljana graph, which is the third smallest existing semi-symmetric cubic graph of regular degree 3. The Ljubljana graph has girth 10.

In fact, it is proven that the Dejter graph can be 2-colored, say in the color set {red, blue}, as in the top figure to the right, so that both the resulting edge-monochromatic red and blue vertex-spanning subgraphs are copies of the Ljubljana graph. These two copies contain exactly the 112 vertices of the Dejter graph and 168 edges each, having both copies girth 10, while the Dejter graph has girth 6 and the 7-cube girth 4. It seems that the Dejter graph is the smallest symmetric graph having a connected self-complementary vertex-spanning semi-symmetric cubic subgraph.

Both the red and blue vertex-spanning Ljubljana subgraphs of the Dejter graph can be presented as covering graphs of the Heawood graph, namely as 8-covers of the Heawood graph. This is suggested in each of the two representations of the Ljubljana graph, (red above, blue below, both to the right), by alternately coloring the inverse images of successive vertices of the Heawood graph, say in black and white (better viewed by twice clicking on images for figure enlargements), according to the Heawood graph bipartition. Each such inverse image is formed by the 8 neighbors, along a fixed coordinate direction of the 7-cube, of the half of the Hamming code having a fixed weight, 0 or 1. By exchanging these weights via the permutation (0 1), one can pass from the adjacency offered by the red Ljubljana graph to the one offered by the blue Ljubljana graph, or vice versa.

One seventh of the Dejter graph appears in a separate figure down below that can be obtained from the two resulting copies of the Heawood graph.
