= Higman's lemma =

In mathematics, Higman's lemma states that the set $\Sigma^*$ of finite sequences over a finite alphabet $\Sigma$, as partially ordered by the subsequence relation, is a well partial order. That is, if $w_1, w_2, \ldots\in \Sigma^*$ is an infinite sequence of words over a finite alphabet $\Sigma$, then there exist indices $i < j$ such that $w_i$ can be obtained from $w_j$ by deleting some (possibly none) symbols. More generally the set of sequences is well-quasi-ordered even when $\Sigma$ is not necessarily finite, but is itself well-quasi-ordered, and the subsequence ordering is generalized into an "embedding" quasi-order that allows the replacement of symbols by earlier symbols in the well-quasi-ordering of $\Sigma$. This is a special case of the later Kruskal's tree theorem. It is named after Graham Higman, who published it in 1952.

== Proof ==
The following proof, due to Crispin Nash-Williams, uses an elegant "minimal bad sequence" argument.

Let $\Sigma$ be a well-quasi-ordered alphabet of symbols (in particular, $\Sigma$ could be finite and ordered by the identity relation). Suppose for a contradiction that there exist infinite bad sequences, i.e. infinite sequences of words $w_1, w_2, w_3, \ldots\in \Sigma^*$ such that no $w_i$ embeds into a later $w_j$. Then there exists an infinite bad sequence of words $W=(w_1, w_2, w_3, \ldots)$ that is minimal in the following sense: $w_1$ is a word of minimum length from among all words that start infinite bad sequences; $w_2$ is a word of minimum length from among all infinite bad sequences that start with $w_1$; $w_3$ is a word of minimum length from among all infinite bad sequences that start with $w_1,w_2$; and so on. In general, $w_i$ is a word of minimum length from among all infinite bad sequences that start with $w_1,\ldots,w_{i-1}$.

Since no $w_i$ can be the empty word, we can write $w_i = a_i z_i$ for $a_i\in\Sigma$ and $z_i\in\Sigma^*$. Since $\Sigma$ is well-quasi-ordered, the sequence of leading symbols $a_1, a_2, a_3, \ldots$ must contain an infinite increasing sequence $a_{i_1} \le a_{i_2} \le a_{i_3} \le \cdots$ with $i_1<i_2<i_3<\cdots$.

Now consider the sequence of words
$$w_1, \ldots, w_{{i_1}-1}, z_{i_1}, z_{i_2}, z_{i_3}, \ldots.$$
Because $z_{i_1}$ is shorter than $w_{i_1} = a_{i_1} z_{i_1}$, this sequence is "more minimal" than $W$, and so it must contain a word $u$ that embeds into a later word $v$. But $u$ and $v$ cannot both be $w_j$'s, because then the original sequence $W$ would not be bad. Similarly, it cannot be that $u$ is a $w_j$ and $v$ is a $z_{i_k}$, because then $w_j$ would also embed into $w_{i_k}=a_{i_k}z_{i_k}$. And similarly, it cannot be that $u=z_{i_j}$ and $v=z_{i_k}$, $j<k$, because then $w_{i_j}=a_{i_j}z_{i_j}$ would embed into $w_{i_k}=a_{i_k}z_{i_k}$. In every case we arrive at a contradiction.

== Ordinal type ==
The ordinal type of $\Sigma^*$ is related to the ordinal type of $\Sigma$ as follows:
$$o(\Sigma^*)=\begin{cases}\omega^{\omega^{o(\Sigma)-1}},&o(\Sigma) \text{ finite};\\ \omega^{\omega^{o(\Sigma)+1}},&o(\Sigma)=\varepsilon_\alpha+n \text{ for some }\alpha\text{ and some finite }n;\\ \omega^{\omega^{o(\Sigma)}},&\text{otherwise}.\end{cases}$$

== Reverse-mathematical calibration ==
Higman's lemma has been reverse mathematically calibrated (in terms of subsystems of second-order arithmetic) as equivalent to $ACA_0$ over the base theory $RCA_0$.
