= Folkman's theorem =

Theorem in arithmetic combinatorics on finite partitions of the natural numbers

Folkman's theorem is a theorem in mathematics, and more particularly in arithmetic combinatorics and Ramsey theory. According to this theorem, whenever the natural numbers are partitioned into finitely many subsets, there exist arbitrarily large sets of numbers all of whose sums belong to the same subset of the partition. The theorem had been discovered and proved independently by several mathematicians, before it was named "Folkman's theorem", as a memorial to Jon Folkman, by Graham, Rothschild, and Spencer.

== Statement of the theorem ==
Let N be the set {1, 2, 3, ...} of positive integers, and suppose that N is partitioned into k different subsets N_{1}, N_{2}, ... N_{k}, where k is any positive integer. Then Folkman's theorem states that, for every positive integer m, there exists a set S_{m} and an index i_{m} such that S_{m} has m elements and such that every sum of a nonempty subset of S_{m} belongs to N_{i_{m}}.

== Relation to Rado's theorem and Schur's theorem ==
Schur's theorem in Ramsey theory states that, for every positive integer k, there exists a positive integer S, such that for every partition of the integers $\{1,\ldots, S \}$ into k parts, one of the parts contains integers x, y and z with $x + y = z$. That is, it is the special case m = 2 of Folkman's theorem.

Rado's theorem in Ramsey theory concerns a similar problem statement in which the integers are partitioned into finitely many subsets; the theorem characterizes the integer matrices A with the property that the system of linear equations A x = 0 can be guaranteed to have a solution in which every coordinate of the solution vector x belongs to the same subset of the partition. A system of equations is said to be regular whenever it satisfies the conditions of Rado's theorem; Folkman's theorem is equivalent to the regularity of the system of equations

$$x_T = \sum_{i\in T}x_{\{i\}},$$

where T ranges over each nonempty subset of the set {1, 2, ..., m}.

== Multiplication versus addition ==
It is possible to replace addition by multiplication in Folkman's theorem: if the natural numbers are finitely partitioned, there exist arbitrarily large sets S such that all products of nonempty subsets of S belong to a single partition set. Indeed, if one restricts S to consist only of powers of two, then this result follows immediately from the additive version of Folkman's theorem. However, it is open whether there exist arbitrarily large sets such that all sums and all products of nonempty subsets belong to a single partition set. The first example of nonlinearity in Ramsey Theory which does not consist of monomials was given, independently, by Furstenberg and Sarkozy in 1977, with the family {x, x + y^{2}}, result which was further improved by Bergelson in 1987. In 2016, J. Moreira proved there exists a set of the form {x, x + y, xy} contained in an element of the partition However it is not even known whether there must necessarily exist a set of the form {x, y, x + y, xy} for which all four elements belong to the same partition set.

== Canonical Folkman Theorem ==
Let $FS(\{x_i\}_{i = 1}^n)$ denote the set of all finite sums of elements of $\{x_i\}_{i = 1}^n$. Let $C$ be a (possibly infinite) coloring of the positive integers, and let $n$ be an arbitrary positive integer. There exists $\{x_i\}_{i = 1}^n$ such that at least one of the following 3 conditions holds.

1) $FS(\{x_i\}_{i = 1}^n)$ is a monochromatic set.

2) $FS(\{x_i\}_{i = 1}^n)$ is a rainbow set.

3) For any $B \subseteq [1,n]$, the color of $\sum_{i \in B}x_i$ is determined solely by $\min(B)$.

== Previous results ==
Variants of Folkman's theorem had been proved by Richard Rado and by J. H. Sanders. Folkman's theorem was named in memory of Jon Folkman by Ronald Graham, Bruce Lee Rothschild, and Joel Spencer, in their book on Ramsey theory.
