= North Carolina–Moldova National Guard Partnership =

Bilateral association

North Carolina–Moldova State Partnership
- Part of the U.S. European Command State Partnership Program
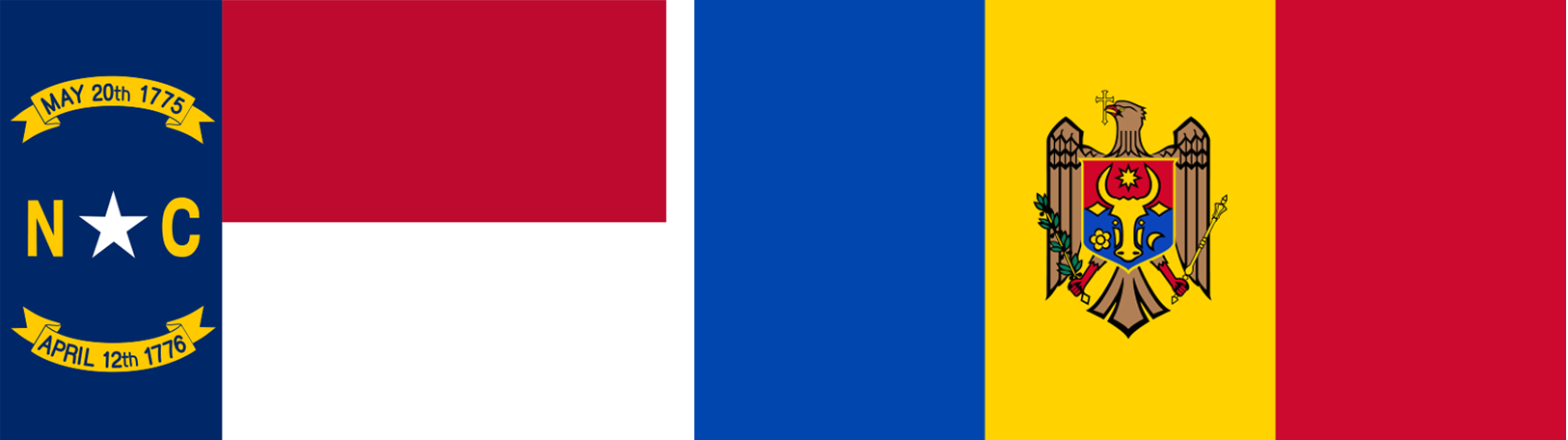
- Origin: 1996
- Country president: Maia Sandu
- Prime minister: Ion Chicu
- Minister of defense: Alexandru Pînzari
- Ambassador to Moldova: Dereck J. Hogan
- Adjutant general: Gregory Lusk
- 2012 Engagements: 9
- NATO member: No
- EU member: No

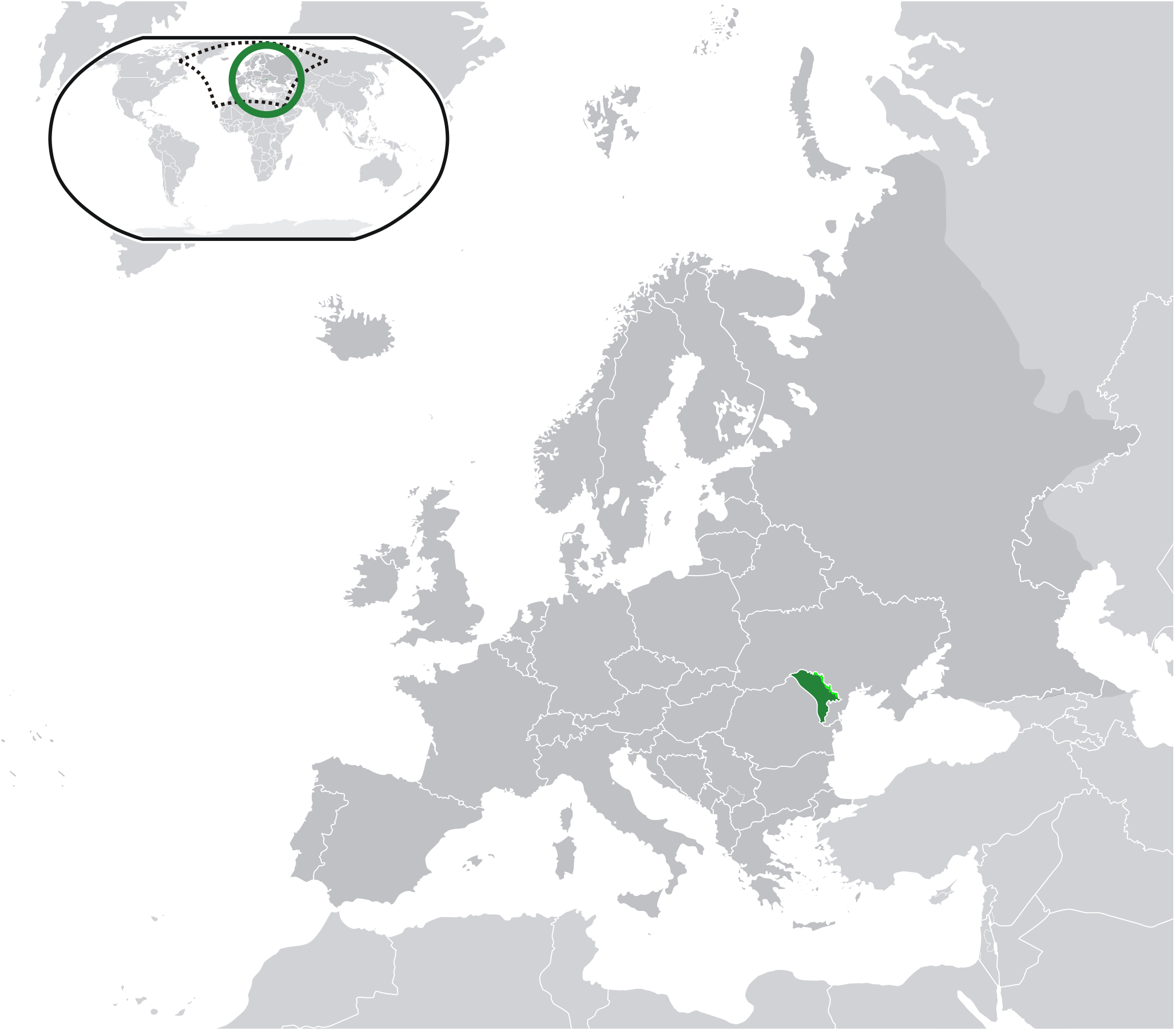
Moldova

The North Carolina–Moldova National Guard Partnership is one of 25 European partnerships that make up the U.S. European Command State Partnership Program and one of 88 worldwide partnerships that make up the National Guard State Partnership Program. The Partnership was formalized on April 22, 1999. It has since evolved into a partnership that includes the efforts of many more organizations and individuals such as private firms, civic organizations and non-profit agencies. The partnership is a bi-lateral association with planning committees in both North Carolina and the Republic of Moldova who work together in a cooperative effort to improve and enrich the lives of everyone it touches.

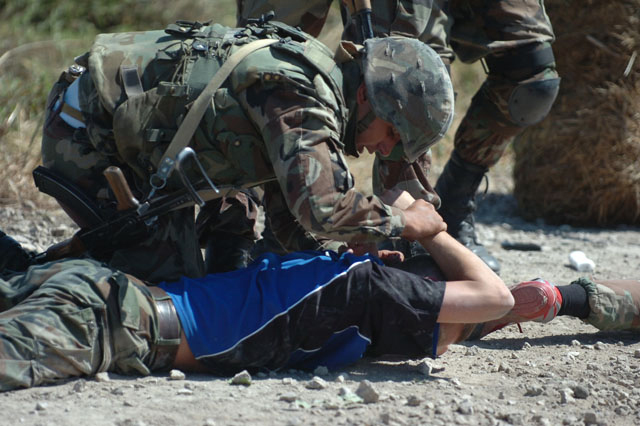
A Moldovan Soldier takes a mock bandit into custody as part of an exercise designed to help Moldovans sharpen their peacekeeping skills in advance of a 2012 NATO evaluation.

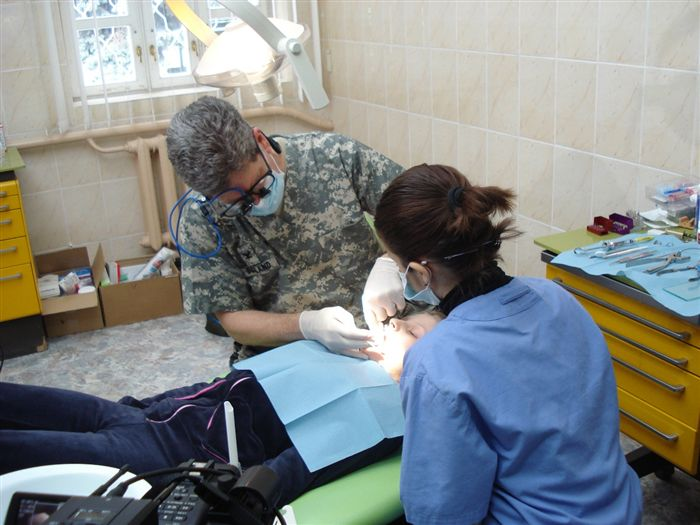
In 2012, a team of dentists from the North Carolina National Guard and a team of dentists from the University of North Carolina traveled to Moldova to provide free dental care to Moldovan children.

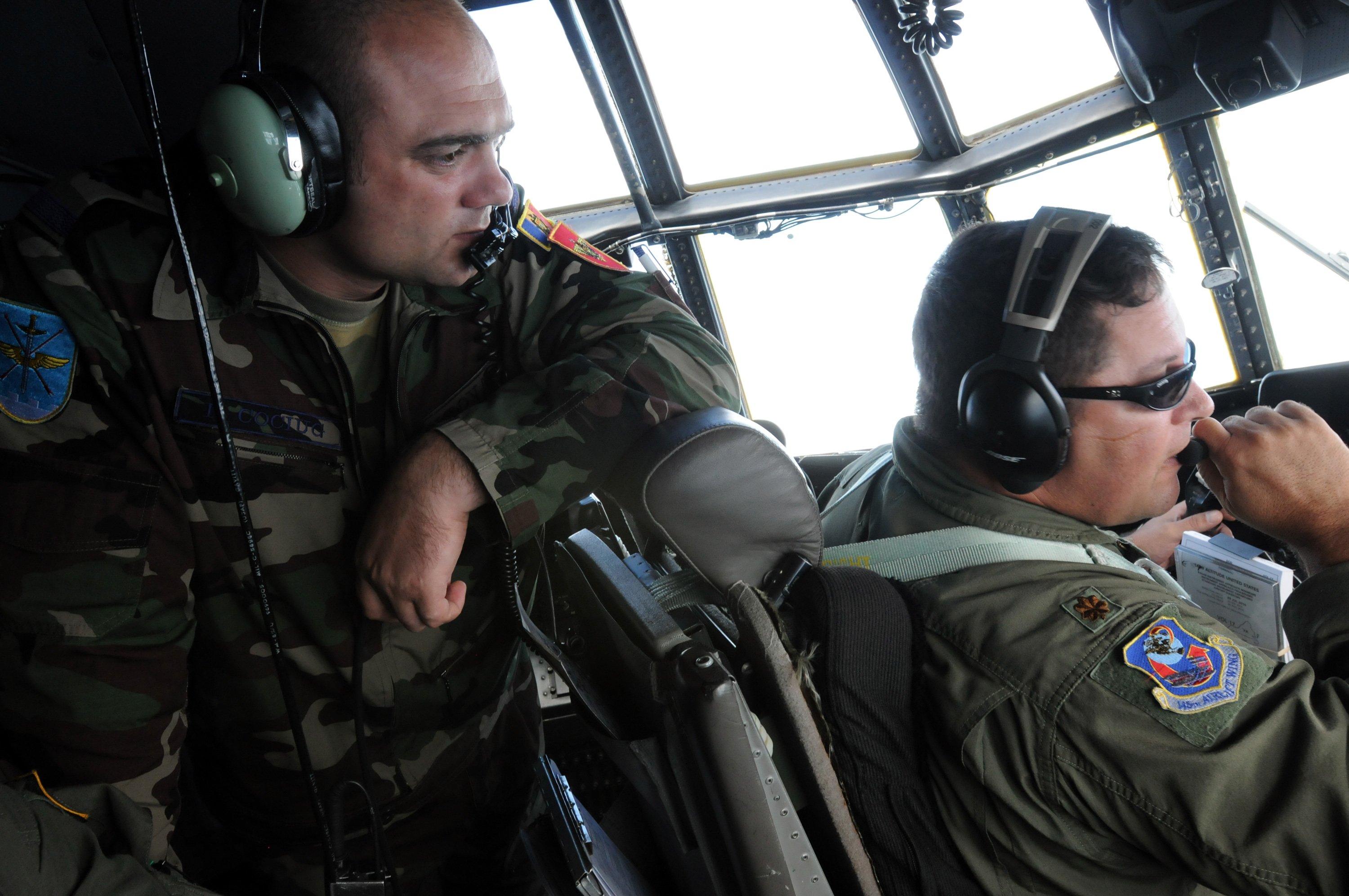
A North Carolina National Guard C-130 pilot talks to a Moldovan Officer during a medical evacuation check ride over North Carolina to learn medical evacuation techniques.

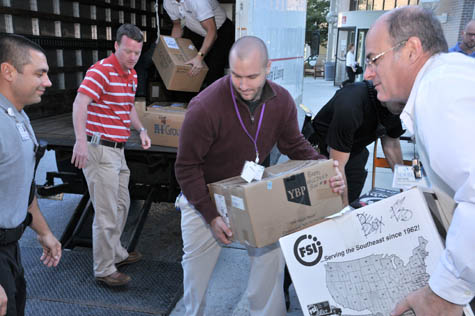
A contribution of medical journals donated by North Carolina medical professionals to provide current medical texts for Moldovan health care providers who don't always have access to the latest medical research.

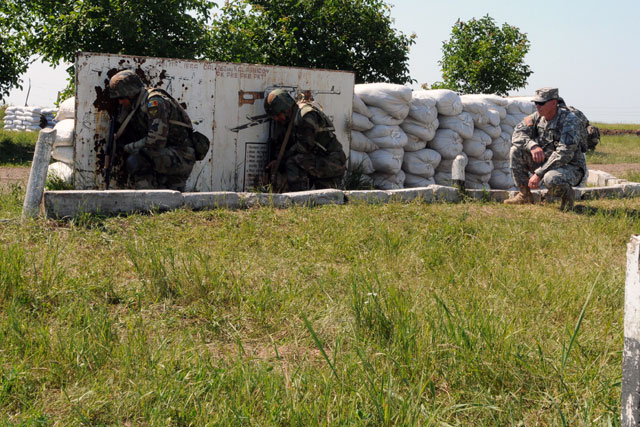
A North Carolina National Guard Soldier observes Soldiers of the Moldovan army show off their capabilities as a unit before their NATO evaluation.

== History ==
Overview

- Republic of Moldova declared its independence in 1991
- Established the partnership on 22 April 1999
- Moldova Participated in joint exercises (MEDCEUR, Rapid Trident, Combined Endeavor, Cyber Endeavor, JCET)
- Moldovan National Army primarily consists of Land Forces with a small Air Force element
- 6 Moldovan Contingents (117 military) participated in demining missions in Iraq between 2003 and 2008
- Mil-to Civ events focused on dental treatments to children from orphanages and on disaster response and preparedness
- The Mil-to-Mil events focused on assisting the Moldovan military with developing its organic capabilities in the following areas: peacekeeping, SF, medical, logistics etc.

In 1995, North Carolina had been partnered with Moldova as part of a program of military-to-military contact between the United States and emerging democracies of the former Soviet Union. It wasn't until 1999, however, that the program really began to take off. Led by a North Carolina National Guard officer, what was then the Military Liaison Team (MLT) began overseeing contact between the National Army of Moldova and the various services of the United States military. Like elsewhere in the former Soviet Union and Eastern Bloc, the aim was simple – engage the Moldovan military, enlarge America's circle of friends and provide a secure platform for freedom, prosperity and peace where the soldier is subordinate to civilian authority. Using a grass-roots organization like the National Guard with its base of citizen soldiers and airmen was seen as the best way to connect.

Before military contact began, North Carolina citizens had already laid the groundwork for non-military cooperation with this poorest nation in Europe as early as 1995. In 1999, then Governor James B. Hunt Jr., signed the formal bilateral cooperation agreement with then Moldovan President Petru Lucinschi, an agreement that was renewed in 2004 by Governor Michael F. Easley. The Agreement was renewed in 2010, signed by Vlad Filat, Republic of Moldova Prime-Minister, and Elaine Marshall, North Carolina Secretary of State.

Secretary Marshall is the head of the NC-Moldova Bilateral Committee and she has been part of it for over 10 years. She has visited MDA on committee business in support of the partnership on several occasions and has hosted several MDA GOV delegations to NC (to include the President of MDA). She has been invited to MDA by the US Embassy, the NCNG and private NC NGOs on different occasions. While she has no role in the NCNG, she has traveled with the current and former TAG's and has been very supportive of the BAO mission in MDA.

On the civilian side of the partnership, North Carolina had more than 60 projects accomplished or ongoing. The projects include engagement in secondary and higher education, exchanges of medical and dental students and practitioners to the arts, agriculture, business, government reform and simple humanitarian aid in the form of donated medical equipment, clothing and computers.

In 2000 NCNG engineers have teamed up with USMC Seabees (within the 2000 CORNERSTONE exercise) to build a much-needed medical out-patient clinic at the country's largest orphanage/boarding school in Straseni. The NCNG has also conducted well digging projects in Straseni, while the civilians from NC have paid for the pumps to operate them. North Carolinians have adopted Moldovan children, paid for reconstructive surgery, both in Moldova and in the United States, funded private dental missions and Moldovan students have benefited from internships in offices at the highest levels of North Carolina state government.

In 2003, a NCARNG training term provided instruction to Moldovan Carabinerii (military police) and civil police on counter-terrorism. Other Mil-to-Civ projects included – building a playground, facilitating the donation of two dental chairs to boarding schools, encouraging a series of virtual classes between UNC and Moldova State Medical University. Military and civilian medical professionals have teamed up to provide dental treatment and immunizations against hepatitis A, hepatitis B and chickenpox to nearly 25,000 Moldovan children in boarding schools.

In 2013, the North Carolina-Moldova State Partnership Program will support a new mission which will focus on developing the nursing capabilities within the Moldovan Army and civilian institutions. North Carolinians have also privately funded dozens of humanitarian trips to Moldova to treat children's dental needs free-of-charge. Several NC organizations have also donated humanitarian aid in the form of medical equipment, water distillers, books, clothing and computers worth over US$750,000.

In the summer of 2013 a contingent from the Air National Guard of different states are going to contribute with personnel to the construction of a Medical and Rehabilitation Center in Marculesti town, Floresti district. The military will be working on a two-week rotation schedule as part of their training to help enhance medical capabilities in the area.

During the period of 2008-2012 various contingents of the North Carolina National Guard worked side-by-side with the Moldovan Peacekeeping Force to assist them in their efforts of getting certified within the NATO Operations Capability Concept (OCC) evaluation and certification process. The assistance North Carolina National Guard provided to the Moldovan Army Peacekeeping Force was also augmented in 2012 by a team of US Marines from the Black Sea Rotational Force. The five-year interaction culminated in 2012 with the MDA Peacekeeping contingent being declared "Mission Ready" by a team of NATO OCC Evaluators. This allows Moldova to contribute to the international peacekeeping missions and operations.

A more recent engagement between the US SF & MDA SF started in 2012 focusing on the SF training infrastructure and methodology to ensure readiness for deployments and potential co-deployments. Several events have been conducted to gain a better understanding of each other's organizational structure, experience a traditional ARNG SF drill period, and conduct face to face planning for the upcoming TCT and Unit Level Training (ULT) events.

== Partnership focus ==
The North Carolina and Moldova seek to strengthen their relations through the increase and improvement in their commitment to mutual cooperation, coordination, and understanding.

The focus for 2013 and 2014 is:

- Disaster Preparedness
- Cyber Security
- Prepare Military Forces for Peacekeeping Missions
- Military Medical Capabilities
- Military Academy Curriculum Development
- Special Operations Forces (SOF) Actions, and Activities
- Essential Services
