= Hall–Higman theorem =

Theorem in group theory

In mathematical group theory, the Hall–Higman theorem, due to Philip Hall and Graham Higman (1956, Theorem B), describes the possibilities for the minimal polynomial of an element of prime power order for a representation of a p-solvable group.

== Statement ==
Suppose that G is a p-solvable group with no normal p-subgroups, acting faithfully on a vector space over a field of characteristic p. If x is an element of order p^{n} of G then the minimal polynomial is of the form (X − 1)^{r} for some r ≤ p^{n}. The Hall–Higman theorem states that one of the following 3 possibilities holds:

- r = p^{n}
- p is a Fermat prime and the Sylow 2-subgroups of G are non-abelian and r ≥ p^{n} −p^{n−1}
- p = 2 and the Sylow q-subgroups of G are non-abelian for some Mersenne prime q = 2^{m} − 1 less than 2^{n} and r ≥ 2^{n} − 2^{n−m}.

== Examples ==
The group SL_{2}(F_{3}) is 3-solvable (in fact solvable) and has an obvious 2-dimensional representation over a field of characteristic p=3, in which the elements of order 3 have minimal polynomial (X−1)^{2} with r=3−1.
