= Jon Folkman =

American mathematician

Jon Hal Folkman
- Born: December 8, 1938; Ogden, Utah, US
- Died: January 23, 1969 (aged 30); Los Angeles, California, US
- Education: Princeton University
- Known for: Folkman graph Shapley–Folkman lemma & theorem Folkman–Lawrence representation Folkman's theorem (memorial); Homology of lattices and matroids
- Awards: Putnam Fellow (1960)
- Scientific career
- Fields: Combinatorics
- Workplaces: RAND Corporation
- Doctoral advisor: John Milnor

Jon Hal Folkman (December 8, 1938 – January 23, 1969) was an American mathematician, a student of John Milnor, and a researcher at the RAND Corporation.

== Schooling ==
Folkman was a Putnam Fellow in 1960. He received his Ph.D. in 1964 from Princeton University, under the supervision of Milnor, with a thesis entitled Equivariant Maps of Spheres into the Classical Groups.

== Research ==
Jon Folkman found the semi-symmetric graph with the fewest possible vertices, the Folkman graph.

Jon Folkman contributed important theorems in many areas of combinatorics.

In geometric combinatorics, Folkman is known for his pioneering and posthumously-published studies of oriented matroids; in particular, the Folkman–Lawrence topological representation theorem is "one of the cornerstones of the theory of oriented matroids". In lattice theory, Folkman solved an open problem on the foundations of combinatorics by proving a conjecture of Gian–Carlo Rota; in proving Rota's conjecture, Folkman characterized the structure of the homology groups of "geometric lattices" in terms of the free Abelian groups of finite rank. In graph theory, he was the first to study semi-symmetric graphs, and he discovered the semi-symmetric graph with the fewest possible vertices, now known as the Folkman graph. He proved the existence, for every positive h, of a finite K_{h + 1}-free graph which has a monocolored K_{h} in every 2-coloring of the edges, settling a problem previously posed by Paul Erdős and András Hajnal. He further proved that if G is a finite graph such that every set S of vertices contains an independent set of size (|S| − k)/2 then the chromatic number of G is at most k + 2.

In convex geometry, Folkman worked with his RAND colleague Lloyd Shapley to prove the Shapley–Folkman lemma and theorem: Their results suggest that sums of sets are approximately convex; in mathematical economics their results are used to explain why economies with many agents have approximate equilibria, despite individual nonconvexities.

In additive combinatorics, Folkman's theorem states that for each assignment of finitely many colors to the positive integers, there exist arbitrarily large sets of integers all of whose nonempty sums have the same color; the name was chosen as a memorial to Folkman by his friends. In Ramsey theory, the Rado–Folkman–Sanders theorem describes "partition regular" sets.

=== The Folkman Number F(p, q; r) ===
For r > max{p, q}, let F(p, q; r) denote the minimum number of vertices in a graph G that has the following properties:

1. G contains no complete subgraph on r vertices,
2. in any green-red coloring of the edges of G there is either a green K_{p} or a red K_{q} subgraph.

Some results are

- F(3, 3; 5) < 18 (Martin Erickson)
- F(2, 3; 4) < 1000 (Vojtěch Rödl, Andrzej Dudek)

== Brain cancer and despair ==
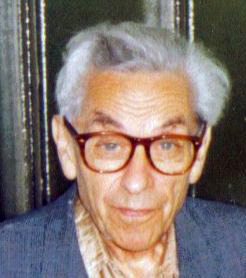
Paul Erdős visited Jon Folkman after Folkman awoke from surgery for brain cancer. To restore Folkman's confidence, Erdős immediately challenged him to solve mathematical problems.

In the late 1960s, Folkman suffered from brain cancer; while hospitalized, Folkman was visited repeatedly by Ronald Graham and Paul Erdős. After his brain surgery, Folkman was despairing that he had lost his mathematical skills. As soon as Folkman received Graham and Erdős at the hospital, Erdős challenged Folkman with mathematical problems, helping to rebuild his confidence.

Folkman later purchased a gun and killed himself. Folkman's supervisor at RAND, Delbert Ray Fulkerson, blamed himself for failing to notice suicidal behaviors in Folkman. Several years later Fulkerson also killed himself.
