= Carsten Thomassen (mathematician) =

Danish mathematician

Carsten Thomassen (born August 22, 1948 in Grindsted) is a Danish mathematician. He has been a Professor of Mathematics at the Technical University of Denmark since 1981, and since 1990 a member of the Royal Danish Academy of Sciences and Letters. His research concerns discrete mathematics and more specifically graph theory.

Thomassen received his Ph.D. in 1976 from the University of Waterloo.

He is editor-in-chief of the Journal of Graph Theory and the Electronic Journal of Combinatorics, and editor of Combinatorica, the Journal of Combinatorial Theory Series B, Discrete Mathematics, and the European Journal of Combinatorics.

He was awarded the Dedicatory Award of the 6th International Conference on the Theory and Applications of Graphs by the Western Michigan University in May 1988, the Lester R. Ford Award by the Mathematical Association of America in 1993, and the Faculty of Mathematics Alumni Achievement Medal by the University of Waterloo in 2005. In 1990, he was an invited speaker (Graphs, random walks and electric networks) at the ICM in Kyōto. He was included on the ISI Web of Knowledge list of the 250 most cited mathematicians.

== Selected works ==
- with Bojan Mohar: Graphs on Surfaces, Johns Hopkins University Press, 2001
- 5-choosability of planar graphs (see List coloring)
- works on Hypohamiltonian graphs
- Hamilton connectivity of Tournaments (see Tournament (graph theory)) and of 4-connected planar graphs
- his proof of Grötzsch's theorem

== See also ==
- List of University of Waterloo people
