= Semi-symmetric graph =

Graph that is edge-transitive and regular but not vertex-transitive

Graph families defined by their automorphisms
| distance-transitive | → | distance-regular | ← | strongly regular |
- ↓
| symmetric (arc-transitive) | ← | t-transitive, t ≥ 2 | | skew-symmetric |
- ↓
| _{(if connected)} vertex- and edge-transitive | → | edge-transitive and regular | → | edge-transitive |
| ↓ | | ↓ | | ↓ |
| vertex-transitive | → | regular | → | _{(if bipartite)} biregular |
- ↑
| Cayley graph | ← | zero-symmetric | | asymmetric |

The Folkman graph, the smallest semi-symmetric graph.

In the mathematical field of graph theory, a semi-symmetric graph is an undirected graph that is edge-transitive and regular, but not vertex-transitive. In other words, a graph is semi-symmetric if each vertex has the same number of incident edges, and there is a symmetry taking any of the graph's edges to any other of its edges, but there is some pair of vertices such that no symmetry maps the first into the second.

== Properties ==
A semi-symmetric graph must be bipartite, and its automorphism group must act transitively on each of the two vertex sets of the bipartition (in fact, regularity is not required for this property to hold). For instance, in the diagram of the Folkman graph shown here, green vertices can not be mapped to red ones by any automorphism, but every two vertices of the same color are symmetric with each other.

== History ==
Semi-symmetric graphs were first studied E. Dauber, a student of F. Harary, in a paper, no longer available, titled "On line- but not point-symmetric graphs". This was seen by Jon Folkman, whose paper, published in 1967, includes the smallest semi-symmetric graph, now known as the Folkman graph, on 20 vertices. The term "semi-symmetric" was first used by Klin et al. in a paper they published in 1978.

== For specific degrees ==
=== Cubic graphs ===
The smallest cubic semi-symmetric graph (that is, one in which each vertex is incident to exactly three edges) is the Gray graph on 54 vertices. It was first observed to be semi-symmetric by Bouwer (1968). It was proven to be the smallest cubic semi-symmetric graph by Dragan Marušič and Aleksander Malnič.

All the cubic semi-symmetric graphs on up to 10000 vertices are known. According to Conder, Malnič, Marušič and Potočnik, the four smallest possible cubic semi-symmetric graphs after the Gray graph are the Iofinova–Ivanov graph on 110 vertices, the Ljubljana graph on 112 vertices, a graph on 120 vertices with girth 8 and the Tutte 12-cage.

=== Quartic graphs ===
Any quartic (4-regular or tetravalent) graph can be transformed into a larger quartic graph by the subdivided double construction, which first subdivides each edge into a path of two edges (with a degree-2 subdivision vertex in the middle of the path), and then replaces each vertex from the original by two copies of the vertex, with the same four subdivision vertices as neighbors. For instance, the Folkman graph can be obtained in this way as the subdivided double of the complete graph $K_5$. The subdivided double of an arc-transitive graph is edge-transitive, but may not be vertex-transitive, producing a semi-symmetric graph. Every semi-symmetric quartic graph in which some two vertices have the same neighbors can be constructed as a subdivided double.
