= Marston Conder =

New Zealand mathematician

Marston Conder ONZM
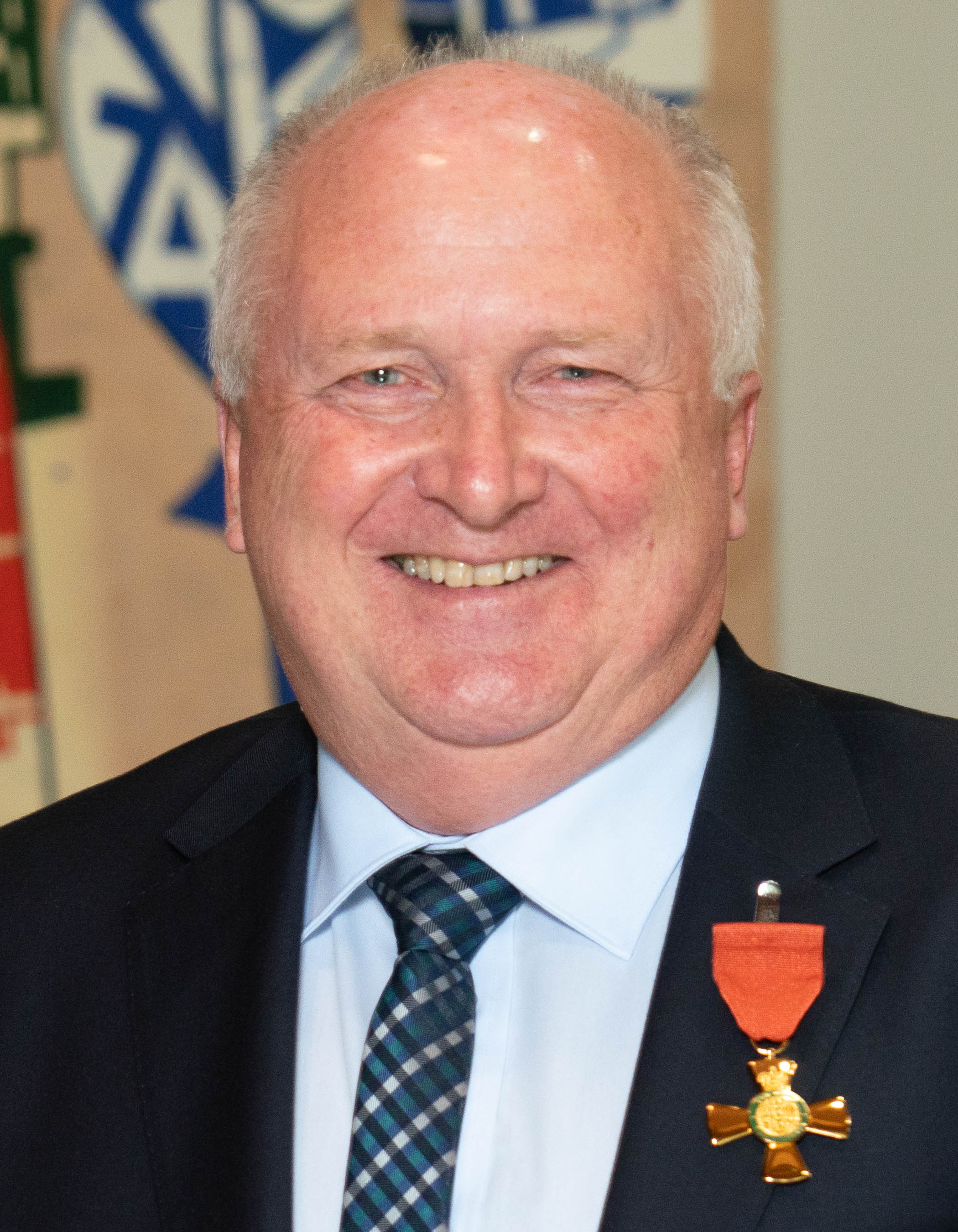
- Conder in 2021
- Born: Marston Donald Edward Conder; 9 September 1955 (age 71); Hamilton, New Zealand
- Education: University of Waikato; University of Oxford (DPhil)
- Scientific career
- Fields: Mathematics
- Workplaces: University of Auckland
- Thesis: Minimal generating pairs for permutation groups (1980)
- Doctoral advisor: Graham Higman
- Website: University of Auckland profile

Marston Donald Edward Conder ONZM (born 9 September 1955) is a New Zealand mathematician, a distinguished professor of mathematics at Auckland University, and the former co-director of the New Zealand Institute of Mathematics and its Applications. His main research interests are in combinatorial group theory, graph theory, and their connections with each other.

== Education and career ==
Conder was born in Hamilton, New Zealand, and studied at Matamata College. He earned a master's degree in social science from Waikato University in 1977, and a doctorate from Oxford University in 1980 under the supervision of Graham Higman. He served as president of the New Zealand Mathematical Society from 1993 to 1995, and as president of the Academy of the Royal Society of New Zealand from 2006 to 2008. In 2011 he was selected as the inaugural Maclaurin Lecturer, as part of a reciprocal exchange between the New Zealand Mathematical Society and the American Mathematical Society.

== Recognition ==
Conder is a fellow of the New Zealand Mathematical Society and of the Royal Society Te Apārangi, and in 2012 became a fellow of the American Mathematical Society. He was named a distinguished alumnus of Waikato University for 2013. In 2011 he was awarded a James Cook Research Fellowship for research on symmetry of discrete structures.

In March 2021 it was announced that Conder has been awarded the 2020 Euler Medal by the Institute of Combinatorics and its Applications for his "many distinguished contributions to combinatorics over the last 40 years."

In 2014 the Royal Society Te Apārangi awarded Conder the Hector Medal, and in 2018 the Jones Medal, named after Vaughan Jones, "for his internationally renowned research on symmetry and chirality in discrete structures, and his exemplary leadership and service in the New Zealand mathematical sciences community". In the 2020 Birthday Honours, he was appointed an Officer of the New Zealand Order of Merit (ONZM) for services to mathematics.
