= H. E. Merritt =

English mechanical engineer

- Born: Henry Edward Merritt; 20 May 1899; West Ham, London, England
- Died: 28 March 1974 (aged 74); Huddersfield, West Yorkshire, England
- Education: Leyton County High School
- Alma mater: University of London
- Occupation: Mechanical engineer
- Known for: Invented the Merritt–Brown triple differential tank transmission; Gears (1942); Gear Trains (1947)

Henry Edward Merritt MBE (20 May 1899 – 28 March 1974) was a British mechanical engineer who invented the Merritt–Brown triple differential tank transmission that provided greater manoeuvrability to a generation of British tanks, starting with the Churchill in 1939 and continuing into the 1980s. It allowed a tracked vehicle to change direction while on the move with less loss of power than under other steering systems, and to perform a neutral turn on the spot by rotating its tracks in opposite directions. Merritt's invention suited the faster pace of tank warfare of the Second World War, which contrasted with the more static trench warfare of the First World War, for which earlier generations of British tanks had been optimised.

He wrote a number of books, including the standard texts Gears (1942), which received three editions, and its companion volume Gear Trains (1947), which included a Brocot table derived from the work of the French clockmaker and mathematician Achille Brocot.

He complained that gearing was a field dominated by empiricism in which science had so far played little role, so that it had hardly progressed in 150 years, but Brian Hayes found sophisticated mathematical concepts in use in the field and, for him, a surprising degree of interchange between mathematics and mechanics. By 2000, many of the problems that Merritt had wrestled with had been solved through the application of brute-force calculations by computers.

== Early life ==
Henry Merritt was born in West Ham, London, on 20 May 1899, to Henry Merritt, a harness-maker, and his wife Jemima. He was educated at Leyton County High School and Erith Technical College before becoming a premium apprentice at Vickers Limited at Erith from 1915 to 1920. He then took a BSc degree in engineering and became an assistant lecturer at West Ham Municipal College from 1920 to 1924. He received his DSc in engineering from the University of London in 1927.

== Career ==
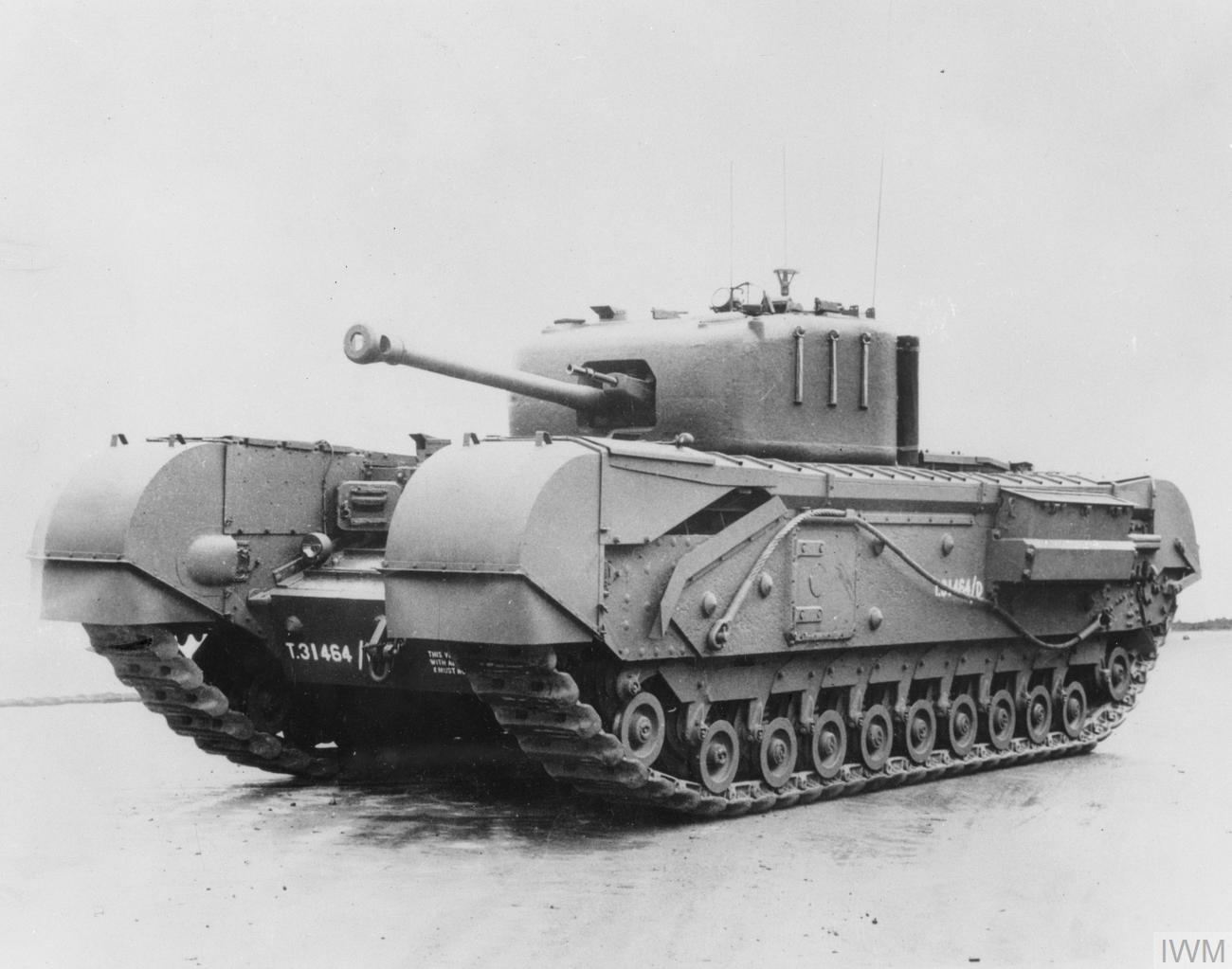
The Churchill was the first production tank to use the Merritt-Brown triple differential.

In 1935, Merritt joined David Brown as a research engineer, and subsequently became their chief engineer. In 1937 he was appointed Superintendent of Design (Tanks) at the Royal Arsenal, Woolwich, and was later Director of Design (Tanks) for the Ministry of Supply. He returned to David Brown in 1940. From 1945 he was a manager in the agricultural division of Morris Motors and from 1949, chief research officer at the British Transport Commission. From 1949 he was at Rootes Group.

While he was at Woolwich, Merritt revised the design of the A20 prototype tank to become the A22 which went into production as the Churchill, incorporating his Merritt-Brown triple differential tank transmission (1939) which allowed a tracked vehicle to have continuously variable steering and mitigated the loss of power found when changing direction using other systems. The system also allowed a tank to perform a neutral turn on the spot by rotating its tracks in opposite directions. The greater manoeuvrability provided by Merritt's invention made British tanks more suited to the faster pace of warfare seen in the early Second World War in France and Poland which contrasted with the more static trench warfare of the First World War for which inter-war British tanks had been optimised. His design was used in several generations of post-war British tanks, the last of which was the Chieftain.

Merritt also designed the epicyclic gearbox for Norbar that allowed more torque to be transmitted through the box, as well as the mechanism for their Slimline torque wrench, launched in 1963, and so called because the whole mechanism was contained within the body of the wrench unlike its predecessors which had external, break-back mechanisms. The firm continued to produce wrenches derived from Merritt's innovation for decades afterwards.

== Writing ==
Example of a gear train

Merritt wrote a number of books, including the standard texts Gears (1942) and its companion volume Gear Trains (1947), the later work including a Brocot table of "all useful numbers up to 200,000". Brian Hayes has commented on the significance of number theory and factoring in gear engineering as demonstrated in Merritt's work in which he suggested that the highest practical number of teeth on a gear was 127, also the largest factor of the "useful" numbers tabulated by Merritt whose table was composed of "a list of all fractions with numerator and denominator no greater than 100, ordered according to magnitude."

Despite being a leading figure in his field and producing works of great erudition, Merritt was at pains to stress the imperfect nature of gear engineering, writing in the first edition of Gears in 1942 that it had hardly advanced since Robertson Buchanan wrote on the subject in 1808. It was a field in which "the physicist has so far played little part" and in which the practitioner "gropes dimly in the fog" relying mostly on empirical methods supplemented by elementary trigonometry and algebra that tended to give a deceptive authority to what was often little more than educated guesswork. By the time of the third edition of Gears in 1954, knowledge had moved on somewhat but Merritt was obliged to admit that empiricism still ruled and that "the behaviour of mating tooth surfaces and their lubricant still awaits a full understanding."

In 1971 Merritt published Gear Engineering, the follow-up to Gears, which was praised by Paul M. Dean Jr. of Mechanical Technology Incorporated for combining strong practical and theoretical content, so allowing American engineers to access European gear techniques that were "used or are respected throughout the world".

== Death and legacy ==
Merritt died in Huddersfield, West Yorkshire, on 28 March 1974. Records relating to him are held by the British National Archives.

Writing about Merritt's 1947 book on gear trains for American Scientist in 2000, Brian Hayes paid tribute to the surprising amount of interchange between mathematics and mechanics evident in the work of Camus, Brocot, and Merritt, but observed uneasily that the power of the electronic computer had "put the gearmakers out of work" as all practical combinations in a gear train could now be calculated in seconds using brute-force techniques so that it was "hardly worth the bother of being clever".

== Honours ==
- Member of the Order of the British Empire (1944 New Year Honours)
- James Clayton Prize of the Institution of Mechanical Engineers (1962)
- Liveryman of the Worshipful Company of Spectacle Makers
- Freeman of the City of London

== Selected publications ==
=== Articles ===
- "Automobile Gears", Proceedings of the Institution of Automobile Engineers, Vol. 20 (1926), No. 2, p. 575.
- "Gear Performance II", Engineer, 8 July 1932.
- "Gear-tooth Stresses and Rating Formulae", Proceedings of the Institution of Mechanical Engineers, Vol. 166 (1952), No. 1.
- "Gear-Tooth Contact Phenomena", Proceedings of the Institution of Mechanical Engineers, Vol. 176, No. 1 (1 June 1962), pp. 141–163.

=== Books ===
- Text Book of Machine Construction and Drawing. Bell, 1922. (With Maurice Platt)
- Gears. Isaac Pitman, London, 1942. (Revised 1943, 2nd 1946, 3rd 1954)
- Gear Trains: Including a Brocot table of decimal equivalents and a table of factors of all useful numbers up to 200,000. Isaac Pitman, London, 1947.
- Gear Engineering. Isaac Pitman, London, 1971.
- The Scope of Gear Research. Institution of Automobile Engineers, n.d.

== See also ==
- Earle Buckingham
