= Anirban Chakraborti =

Indian physicist (born 1975)

Anirban Chakraborti PhD
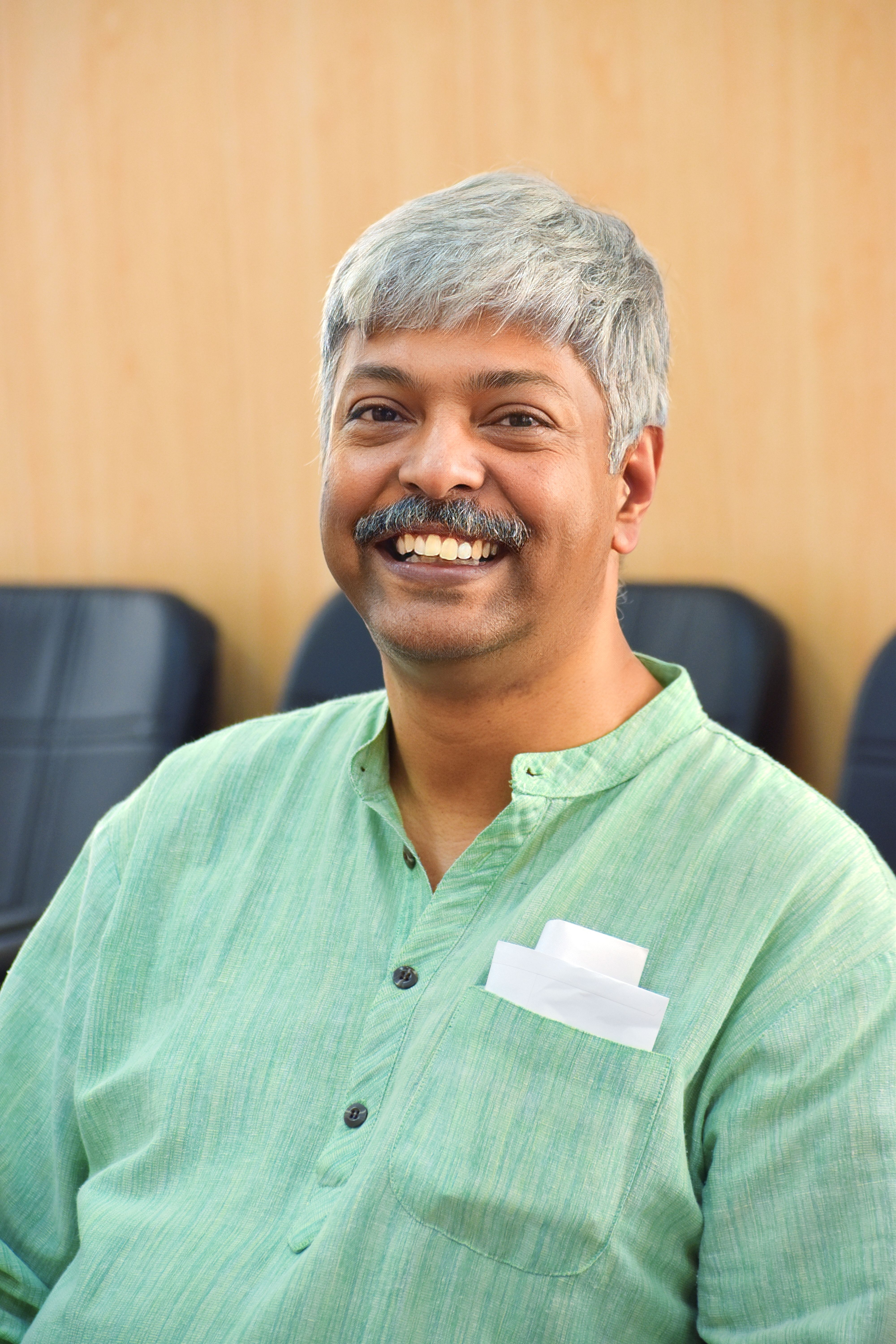
- Anirban Chakraborti in 2023
- Born: 10 February 1975 (age 51)

Academic background
- Education: Doctor of Philosophy in Science; Saha Institute of Nuclear Physics, University of Calcutta
- Thesis: Application of Statistical Physics to some Econophysics and Optimization Problem (2003)
- Doctoral advisor: Bikas K. Chakrabarti

Academic work
- Discipline: Physics, economics
- Sub-discipline: Econophysics, sociophysics

Anirban Chakraborti (born 10 February 1975) is an Indian physicist and professor of econophysics at the School of Computational and Integrative Sciences at Jawaharlal Nehru University in New Delhi. Anirban Chakraborti has published work mainly in the fields of econophysics and data science.

He was elected as fellow of The World Academy of Sciences for "performing important and influential interdisciplinary research on the statistical physics of complex socioeconomic systems, termed 'econophysics' and 'sociophysics'."

== Early life and education ==
Anirban Chakraborti was born in Darjeeling on February 10, 1975. His schooling was done in St. Joseph's School (Darjeeling) and Mount Hermon School (Darjeeling). He completed his bachelor's degree in physics from Scottish Church College, Kolkata and his masters degree in Physics from Rajabazar Science College, University of Calcutta. He then completed his Ph.D. degree from the Saha Institute of Nuclear Physics, under the supervision of Prof. Bikas K. Chakrabarti. He completed the Habilitation à diriger des recherches (HDR) in Physics from the Pierre and Marie Curie University.

== Career ==
Previously, Chakraborti has served as the Chair of Quantitative Finance at École Centrale Paris, France; and Lecturer in theoretical physics at Banaras Hindu University in Varanasi. He held the position of Dean Research and Dean of School of Engineering and Technology at BML Munjal University. He is an international member of the Centro Internacional de Ciencas A.C. He is a founding member of Centre for Complexity Economics, Applied Spirituality and Public Policy, Jindal School of Government and Public Policy.

=== Research interest ===
Chakraborti research interests have focused on kinetic exchange models of income and wealth distributions. Kinetic exchange models are a class of multi agent models, inspired from statistical physics and thermodynamics which attempts to explain the universal features present in income and wealth distributions. Anirban Chakraborti, along with Bikas K. Chakrabarti, proposed the "Chakraborti-Chakrabarti model" which was able to describe the gamma like distributions of income and wealth by taking saving propensity of agents into consideration.

Another model that Chakraborti proposed, named Yard-sale model attempts to describe mechanisms through which inequality arises in wealth and income.

== Published works ==
Chakraborti has published numerous journal articles and textbooks on the topics of econophysics:

- Chakraborti, A.; Chakrabarti, B.K. (August 2000). "Statistical mechanics of money: how saving propensity affects its distribution". The European Physical Journal B. 17 (1): 167–170. arXiv:cond-mat/0004256. Bibcode:2000EPJB...17..167C. doi:10.1007/s100510070173.
- Onnela, J.-P.; Chakraborti, A.; Kaski, K.; Kertész, J.; Kanto, A. (13 November 2003). "Dynamics of market correlations: Taxonomy and portfolio analysis". Physical Review E. 68 (5) 056110. arXiv:cond-mat/0302546. Bibcode:2003PhRvE..68e6110O. doi:10.1103/PhysRevE.68.056110. PMID 14682849.
- Chakrabarti, Bikas K.; Chakraborti, Anirban; Chatterjee, Arnab, eds. (2006). Econophysics and sociophysics: trends and perspectives. Weinheim: Wiley-VCH. ISBN 978-3-527-40670-8.
- Onnela, J.-P.; Chakraborti, A.; Kaski, K.; Kertész, J. (June 2003). "Dynamic asset trees and Black Monday". Physica A: Statistical Mechanics and Its Applications. 324 (1–2): 247–252. arXiv:cond-mat/0212037. Bibcode:2003PhyA..324..247O. doi:10.1016/S0378-4371(02)01882-4.
- Chakrabarti, B. K.; Chakraborti, Anirban; Chakravarty, Satya R.; Chatterjee, Arnab (2013). Econophysics of income and wealth distributions. Cambridge: Cambridge University Press. ISBN 978-1-107-01344-5.

== Awards ==
Chakraborti received the Indian National Science Academy Young Scientist Medal in 2009.

In 2023, Chakraborti was elected as fellow of The World Academy of Sciences for work in econophysics.
