= Distribution of wealth =

Spread of wealth in a society

Wealth share of the richest 1 percent. From Our World in Data. Fully interactive. A higher wealth share correlates with a higher Gini number.

Wealth share of the richest 10 percent. From Our World in Data. Fully interactive.

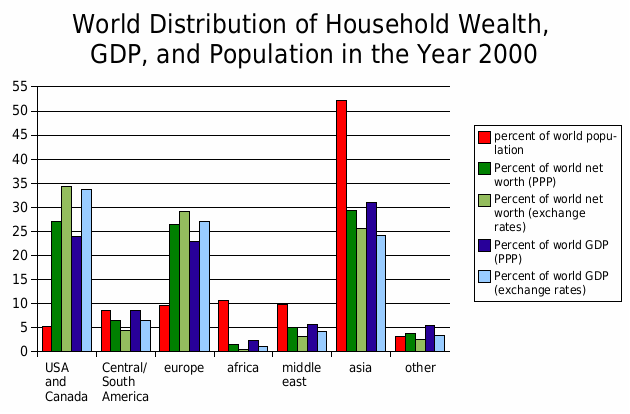
World distribution of wealth, GDP, and population by region in the year 2000.

The distribution of wealth is a comparison of the wealth of various members or groups in a society. It shows one aspect of economic inequality or economic heterogeneity.

The distribution of wealth differs from the income distribution in that it looks at the economic distribution of ownership of the assets in a society, rather than the current income of members of that society. According to the International Association for Research in Income and Wealth, "the world distribution of wealth is much more unequal than that of income."

For rankings regarding wealth, see List of sovereign states by wealth inequality or list of countries by wealth per adult.

== Definition of wealth ==
Wealth of an individual is defined as net worth, expressed as: wealth = assets − liabilities

A broader definition of wealth, which is rarely used in measuring wealth inequality, also includes human capital. For example, the United Nations definition of inclusive wealth is a monetary measure which includes the sum of natural, human, and physical assets.

The relation between wealth, income, and expenses is: change of wealth = saving = income − consumption (expenses). If an individual has a large income but also large expenses, the net effect of that income on their wealth could be small or even negative.

== Conceptual framework ==
There are many ways to analyze the distribution of wealth. One commonly used example is to compare an individual's wealth at the 99th percentile to the median (50th) percentile. This is P99/P50, one of the potential Kuznets ratios, which follows an inverted-U shape, indicating the relationship between inequality and income per capita. Another common measure is the ratio of the total wealth held by the top, say, 1% of the wealth distribution, to the total wealth in the economy. In many societies, the richest ten percent control more than half of the total wealth.

The Pareto Distribution has often been used to mathematically quantify the distribution of wealth at the right tail (the wealth of the very rich); stating that the upper 20% owns 80%, the upper 4% owns 64%, the upper 0.8% owns 51.2%, etc. In fact, the tail of wealth distributions, similar to that of income distribution, behaves like a Pareto distribution but with a thicker tail.

Wealth over people (WOP) curves are a visually compelling way to show the distribution of wealth in a nation. WOP curves are modified distribution-of-wealth curves. The vertical and horizontal scales each show percentages from 0 to 100. We imagine all the households in a nation being sorted from richest to poorest. They are then shrunk down and lined up (richest at the left) along the horizontal scale. For any particular household, its point on the curve represents how its wealth compares (as a proportion) to the average wealth of the richest percentile. For any nation, the average wealth of the richest 1/100 of households is the topmost point on the curve (people, 1%; wealth, 100%) or (p=1, w=100) or (1, 100). In the real world, two points on the WOP curve are always known before any statistics are gathered. These are the topmost point (1, 100) by definition, and the rightmost point (poorest people, lowest wealth) or (p=100, w=0) or (100, 0). This unfortunate rightmost point is given because there is always at least one percent of households (incarcerated, long-term illness, etc.) with no wealth at all. Given that the topmost and rightmost points are fixed ... our interest lies in the form of the WOP curve between them. There are two extreme possible forms of the curve. The first is the "perfect communist" WOP. It is a straight line from the leftmost (maximum-wealth) point, horizontally across the people scale, to p=99. Then it drops vertically to wealth = 0 at (p=100, w=0).

The other extreme is the "perfect tyranny" form. It starts on the left at the tyrant's maximum wealth of 100%. It then immediately drops to zero at p=2 and remains zero horizontally across the rest of the people. That is, the tyrant and his friends (the top percentile) own all the nation's wealth. All other citizens are serfs or enslaved people. An obvious intermediate form is a straight line connecting the left/top point to the right/bottom point. In such a "Diagonal" society, a household in the richest percentile would have just twice the wealth of a family in the median (50th) percentile. Such a society is compelling to many (especially people with low incomes). In fact, it is a comparison to a diagonal society, which is the basis for the Gini values used to measure disequity in a particular economy. These Gini values (40.8 in 2007) indicate that the United States is the third most inequitable economy among developed nations (behind Denmark and Switzerland).

More sophisticated models have also been proposed.

== Theoretical approaches ==
To model aspects of the distribution and holdings of wealth, many different theories have been used. Before the 1960s, data on this were collected mostly from wealth and estate tax records, with additional evidence gathered from small, unrepresentative examinations and other sources. The results from these sources tended to show that the distribution of wealth was highly unequal. That material inheritance played a major role in wealth differences and in the transmission of wealth status from generation to generation. There was also reason to believe that wealth inequality was shrinking over time, and the distribution's shape exhibited statistical regularities that could not have arisen by chance. Thus, early theoretical work on the distribution of wealth sought to explain statistical regularities and to comprehend the relationships among basic forces that could explain the high concentration of wealth and its declining trend over time. John Maynard Keynes explored the impact of monetary policy on wealth distribution in A Tract on Monetary Reform.

More lately, the research about wealth distribution has moved away from the worry with overall distributional characteristics, and in its place focuses more on the grounds of individual differences in the holdings of wealth. This change was caused partly because the importance of saving for retirement increased, and it is reflected in the vital role now assigned to the model of lifecycle savings developed by Modigliani and Brumberg (1954), and Ando and Modigliani (1963). Another important progress has been the increase in availability and finesse in sets of microdata, which offer not just estimations of individuals' asset holdings and savings but also a variety of other household and personal characteristics that can assist in explaining the differences in wealth.

== Wealth inequality ==
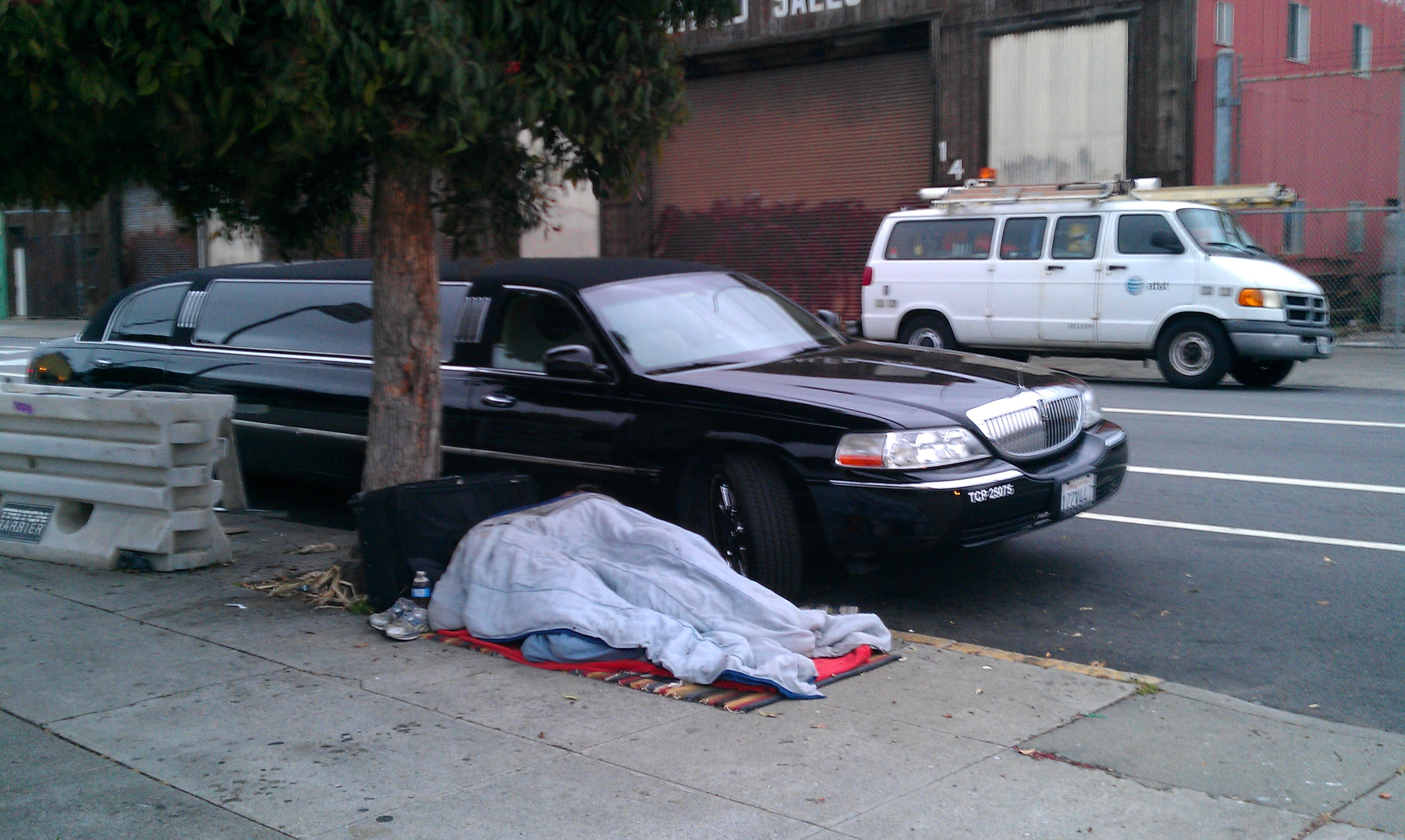
A homeless individual sleeping on the street, next to a limousine

Wealth inequality refers to the uneven distribution of wealth among individuals and entities. Although most research depends on written sources, archaeologists and anthropologists often view large houses as occupied by wealthy households. The distribution of contemporaneous house sizes in a society (perhaps analyzed using the Gini coefficient) then can be regarded as a measure of wealth inequality. This approach has been used at least since 2014 and has shown, for example, that ancient wealth disparities in Eurasia were greater than those in North America and in Mesoamerica following the earliest Neolithic period.

=== Global inequality statistics ===
Share of wealth globally by year, as seen by Oxfam, based on the net worth

A study by the World Institute for Development Economics Research at United Nations University reports that the richest 1% of adults alone owned 40% of global assets in the year 2000, and that the richest 10% of adults accounted for 85% of the world total. The bottom half of the world's adult population owned 1% of global wealth. A 2006 study found that the richest 2% own more than half of global household assets. The Pareto distribution gives 52.8% owned by the upper 1%.

According to the OECD in 2012, the top 0.6% of the world's population (consisting of adults with more than US$1 million in assets) or the 42 million richest people in the world held 39.3% of world wealth. The next 4.4% (311 million people) held 32.3% of world wealth. The bottom 95% held 28.4% of world wealth. The large gaps in the report are reflected in the Gini index of 0.893, which is higher than the global income inequality gap measured in 2009 at 0.38. For example, in 2012 the bottom 60% of the world population held the same wealth in 2012 as the people on Forbes' Richest list consisting of 1,226 richest billionaires of the world.

A 2021 Oxfam report found that collectively, the 10 richest men in the world owned more than the combined wealth of the bottom 3.1 billion people, almost half of the entire world population. Their combined wealth doubled during the pandemic.

'Global Wealth Report 2021', published by Credit Suisse, shows a substantial worldwide increase in wealth inequality during 2020. According to Credit Suisse, the wealth distribution pyramid in 2020 shows that the richest group of the adult population (1.1%) owns 45.8% of the total wealth. Compared with the 2013 wealth distribution pyramid, an overall increase of 4.8% is evident. The bottom half of the world's total adult population, the bottom quartile in the pyramid, owns only 1.3% of the total wealth. Again, compared with the 2013 wealth distribution pyramid, there is a 1.7% decrease. In conclusion, this comparison shows a substantial worldwide increase in wealth inequality over these years.

One of the main explanations for the ongoing increase in wealth inequality is the repercussions of the COVID-19 pandemic. Credit Suisse claims that the economic impact of the pandemic on employment and incomes in 2020 is likely to negatively affect the lowest groups of wealth holders, forcing them to draw more from their savings or take on higher debt. On the other hand, the top wealth groups appeared to be relatively unaffected by this negative trend. Moreover, they seemed to benefit from the lower interest rates' impact on share and house prices.

According to the 'Global Wealth Report 2021' published by Credit Suisse, there were 56 million millionaires in the world in 2020, increasing by 5.2 million from a year earlier. The biggest number of dollar millionaires is reported in the USA, with 22 million millionaires (approximately 39% of the world total). This is far ahead of China, which holds second place with 9.4% of all global millionaires. The third place is currently being held by Japan, with 6.6% of all global millionaires.

The World Inequality Report 2026 stated that the wealthiest 0.001% alone—fewer than 60,000 individuals—control three times more wealth than half of humanity combined.

==== Real estate ====
While sizable numbers of households own no land, few have no income. For example, the top 10% of land owners (all corporations) in Baltimore, Maryland own 58% of the taxable land value. The bottom 10% of those who own any land own less than 1% of the total land value. This form of analysis as well as Gini coefficient analysis has been used to support land value taxation.

=== Wealth distribution pyramid ===
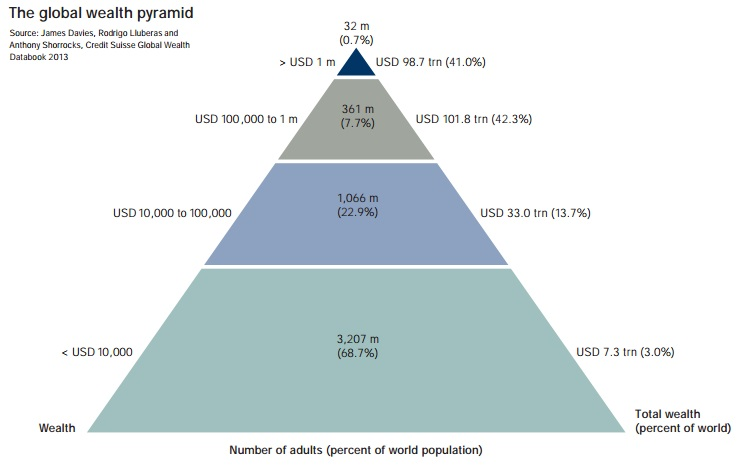
Pyramid of global wealth distribution in 2013

In 2013, Credit Suisse prepared a wealth pyramid infographic (shown right). Personal assets were calculated in net worth, meaning wealth would be negated by having any mortgages. It has a large base of low wealth holders, alongside upper tiers occupied by progressively fewer people. In 2013, Credit Suisse estimated that 3.2 billion individuals – more than two-thirds of adults worldwide – had wealth below US$10,000. A further one billion (adult population) fall within the 10,000 – US$100,000 range. While the average wealth holding is modest in the base and middle segments of the pyramid, their total wealth amounts to US$40 trillion, underscoring the potential for novel consumer products and innovative financial services targeted at this often-neglected segment.

The pyramid shows that:

- Half of the world's net wealth belongs to the top 1%,
- The top 10% of adults hold 85%, while the bottom 90% hold the remaining 15% of the world's total wealth,
- The top 30% of adults hold 97% of the total wealth.

==== Wealth distribution pyramid in 2020 ====
In 2020, Credit Suisse created an updated version of its wealth pyramid infographic. The infographic was constructed similarly to the 2013 pyramid; thus, personal assets were included in net worth. In 2020, Credit Suisse estimated that approximately 2.88 billion people (55% of the adult population) had less than US$10,000 in wealth. Further, 1.7 billion individuals (38.2% of the adult population) have wealth in the range of US$ 10,000 –US$100,000. To continue, 583 million people have wealth within the range of 100,000 – US$1,000,000, and approximately 56 million people (1.1% of the adult population) have wealth over US$1,000,000.

==== Comparison of 2013 and 2020 pyramids ====
Vast differences between the 2013 and 2020 infographics are evident. For the first time, more than 1% of all global adults have wealth over US$1,000,000. Credit Suisse explains in the 'Global Wealth Report 2021' that this increase reflects the economic disruption caused by the pandemic and the disconnect between improvements in households' financial and real assets. However, the biggest difference is in the US$10,000–US$100,000 segment. Since 2013, there has been an increase of almost 10% of total adult population. According to Credit Suisse, the number of adults in this segment tripled since 2000. Credit Suisse attributes this increase to the growing prosperity of emerging economies, especially China, and the expansion of the middle class in the developing world. The upper-middle segment, with wealth in the range of US$100,000–US$1,000,000, has increased by 3.4%. In the report, Credit Suisse states that the middle class in developed countries typically belongs to this group.

=== Wealth outlook for 2020-2025 ===
According to the 'Global Wealth Report 2021', published by Credit Suisse, global wealth is projected to rise by 39% over the next five years, reaching US$583 trillion by 2025. Wealth per adult is also projected to increase by 31%, and so is the number of global millionaires. The wealth pyramid, an infographic used to determine wealth distribution, will also change. The bottom segment covering adults with a net worth below US$10,000 will likely decrease by approximately 108 million over the next five years. The lower-middle segment of the pyramid, comprising adults with a net worth between US$10,000 and US$100,000, is projected to increase by 237 million adults. Most of these new members are most likely to be from lower-income countries. The upper-middle segment, comprising adults with wealth between US$100,000 and US$1 million, is projected to grow by 178 million adults. Most of these new members (approximately 114 million) are likely to come from upper-middle-income countries. The number of global millionaires is also projected to increase. According to estimates from Credit Suisse, the number of global millionaires could exceed 84 million by 2025, an increase of almost 28 million from 2020. The number of millionaires will not only increase in developed countries such as the USA and other European countries, but it is also expected to rise rapidly in lower-income countries. The biggest increase is expected in China, with a 92.7% change, representing about 4.8 million new dollar-millionaires. As a consequence, the number of Ultra High Net Worth Individuals (UHNWI) with net worth exceeding US$50 million will also increase.

=== Gini Coefficient ===
The Gini coefficient (or Gini index) is an indicator often used to measure wealth inequality. A Gini coefficient of 0 reflects perfect equality, where all income or wealth values are the same. In contrast, a Gini coefficient of 1 (or 100%) reflects maximal inequality among values, a situation where a single individual has all the income while all others have none.

According to the UBS Global Wealth Databook 2023 Lesotho had the highest Gini coefficient in 2022 (91.1%); therefore, the wealth distribution in Lesotho is vastly unequal. Slovakia had the lowest Gini coefficient in 2022 (50.8%) among all countries, making it the most equal country in terms of wealth distribution.

=== Geographical distribution ===
Wealth is unevenly distributed across regions of the world. At the end of the 20th century, wealth was concentrated among the G8, Western industrialized nations, several Asian nations, and OPEC nations. In the 21st century, wealth remains concentrated among the G8, with the United States of America leading at 30.2%, along with other developed countries, several Asia-Pacific countries, and OPEC countries.

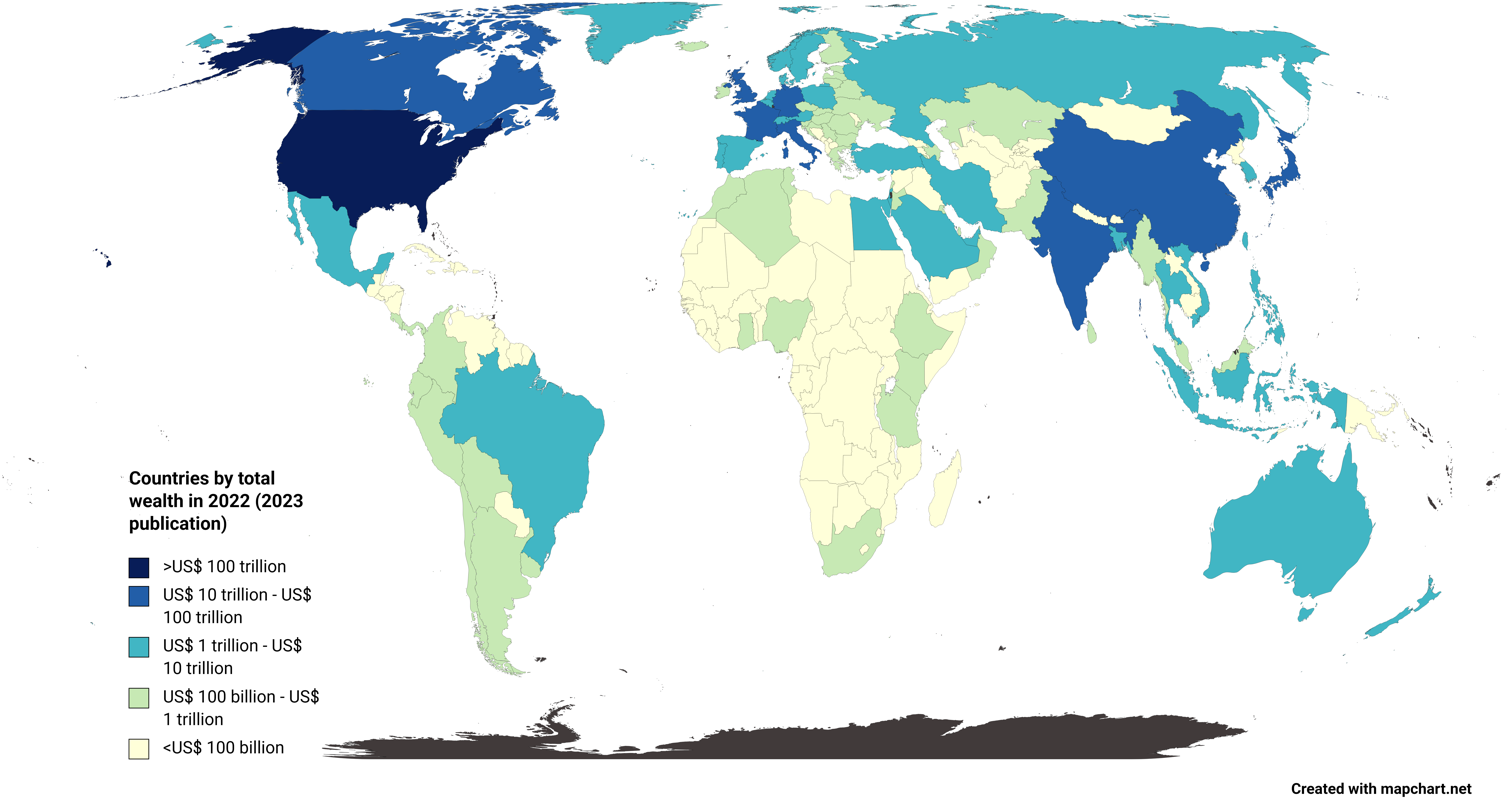
Countries by total wealth (trillions USD), Credit Suisse

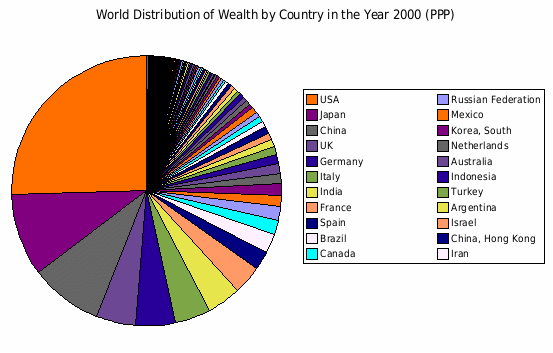
World distribution of wealth by country (PPP)

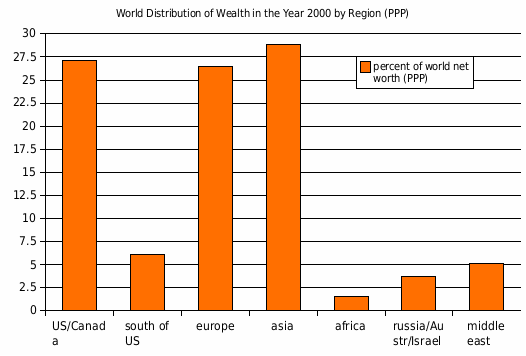
World distribution of wealth by region (PPP)

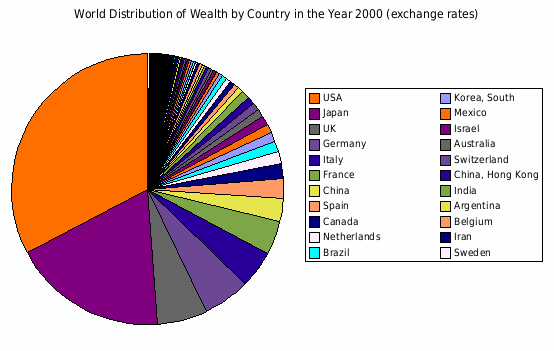
World distribution of wealth by country (exchange rates)

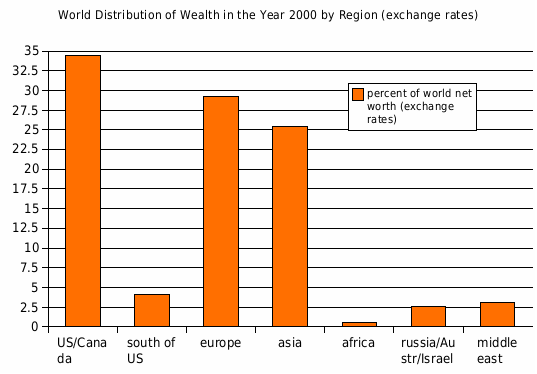
World distribution of wealth by region (exchange rates)

==== By region ====
Region	Proportion of world (%)				
Region	Population	Net worth		GDP	
Region	Population	PPP	Exchange rates	PPP	Exchange rates
North America	5.2	27.1	34.4	23.9	33.7
Central/South America	8.5	6.5	4.3	8.5	6.4
Europe	9.6	26.4	29.2	22.8	32.4
Africa	10.7	1.5	0.5	2.4	1.0
Middle East	9.9	5.1	3.1	5.7	4.1
Asia	52.2	29.4	25.6	31.1	24.1
Other	3.2	3.7	2.6	5.4	3.4
Totals (rounded)	100%	100%	100%	100%	100%

World distribution of financial wealth. In 2007, 147 companies controlled nearly 40 percent of the monetary value of all transnational corporations.

=== In the United States ===
Net personal wealth in the U.S. since 1962, and across age groups

The average personal wealth of people in the top 1% is more than a thousand times that of people in the bottom 50%.

The logarithmic scale shows how wealth has increased for all percentile groups, though more so for wealthier people.

Average net worth—which heavily weights extremely high-wealth families—substantially exceeds median net worth (families in the fiftieth percentile). Further, average net worth outgrew median net worth from 2019 through 2022.

Though the 10th percentile of American households have zero net worth, the 90th percentile has $1.8 million of household wealth.

Higher educational attainment in the US correlates with higher household wealth.

Median wealth of married couples is almost three times that of single individuals, regardless of gender and across all age categories.

Values of transaction accounts—those with immediate "on-demand" access—vary across age groups. Average account values are skewed upward by a small number of high-balance accounts. Median balances in transaction accounts better indicate readily available funds.

According to PolitiFact, in 2011, the 400 wealthiest Americans "have more wealth than half of all Americans combined." Inherited wealth may help explain why many Americans who have become rich may have had a "substantial head start". In September 2012, according to the Institute for Policy Studies, "over 60 percent" of the Forbes richest 400 Americans "grew up in substantial privilege".

In 2007, the richest 1% of the American population owned 34.6% of the country's total wealth (excluding human capital), and the next 19% owned 50.5%. The top 20% of Americans owned 85% of the country's wealth, while the bottom 80% owned 15%. From 1922 to 2010, the share of the top 1% ranged from 19.7% to 44.2%, with the largest decline associated with the late-1970s stock market downturn. Ignoring the period where the stock market was depressed (1976–1980) and the period when the stock market was overvalued (1929), the share of wealth of the richest 1% remained extremely stable, at about a third of the total wealth. Financial inequality was greater than inequality in total wealth, with the top 1% of the population owning 42.7%, the next 19% of Americans owning 50.3%, and the bottom 80% owning 7%. However, following the Great Recession which started in 2007, the share of total wealth owned by the top 1% of the population grew from 34.6% to 37.1%, and that owned by the top 20% of Americans grew from 85% to 87.7%. The Great Recession also caused a 36.1% drop in median household wealth but only an 11.1% drop for the top 1%, further widening the gap between the 1% and the 99%.

Dan Ariely and Michael Norton show in a study (2011) that US citizens across the political spectrum significantly underestimate the current US wealth inequality and would prefer a more egalitarian distribution of wealth, raising questions about ideological disputes over issues like taxation and welfare.

Wealth proportion by population by year (including homes)
Year	Bottom 99%	Top 1%
1922	63.3%	36.7%
1929	55.8%	44.2%
1933	66.7%	33.3%
1939	63.6%	36.4%
1945	70.2%	29.8%
1949	72.9%	27.1%
1953	68.8%	31.2%
1962	68.2%	31.8%
1965	65.6%	34.4%
1969	68.9%	31.1%
1972	70.9%	29.1%
1976	80.1%	19.9%
1979	79.5%	20.5%
1981	75.2%	24.8%
1983	69.1%	30.9%
1986	68.1%	31.9%
1989	64.3%	35.7%
1992	62.8%	37.2%
1995	61.5%	38.5%
1998	61.9%	38.1%
2001	66.6%	33.4%
2004	65.7%	34.3%
2007	65.4%	34.6%
2010	64.6%	35.4%

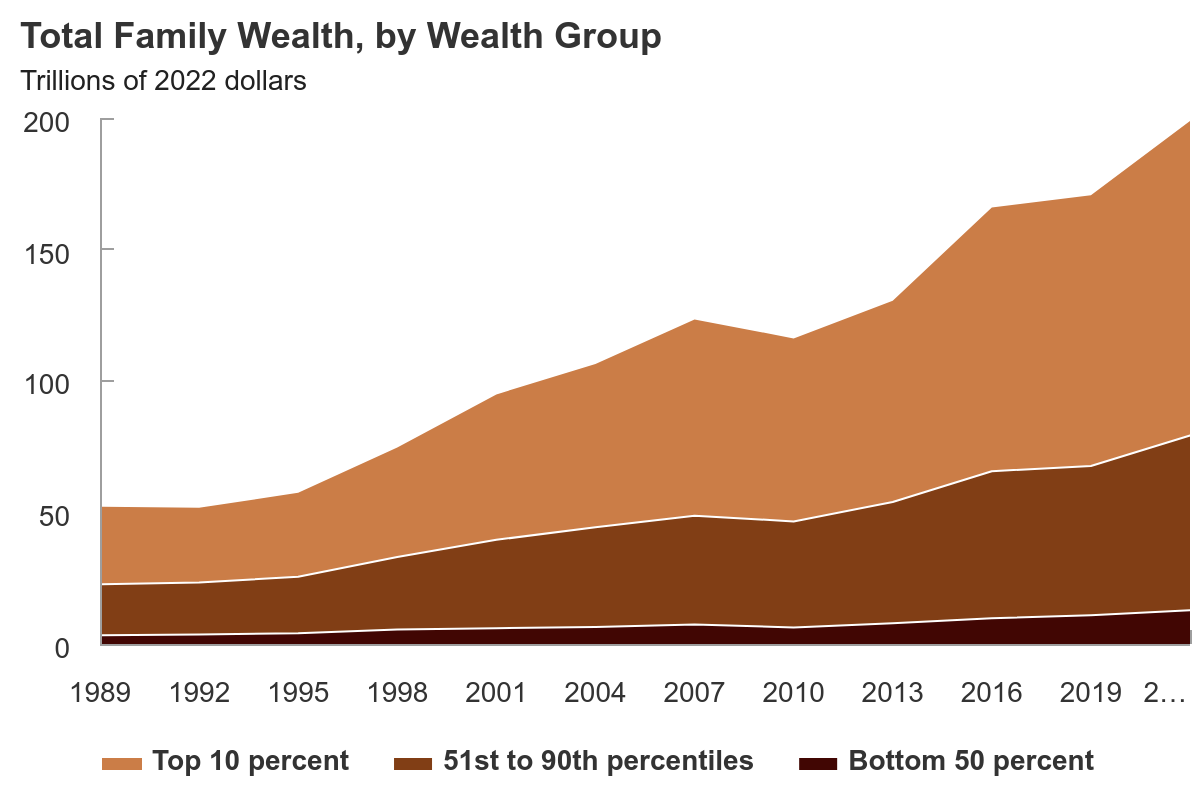
Trends in the distribution of family wealth, 1989 to 2022. Congressional Budget Office.

== Wealth concentration ==
Wealth concentration is a process by which created wealth, under some conditions, can become concentrated within a small group of individuals or entities. Those who hold wealth have the means to invest in newly created sources and structures of wealth, or to leverage the accumulation of wealth otherwise, and are thus the beneficiaries of even greater wealth.

=== Economic conditions ===
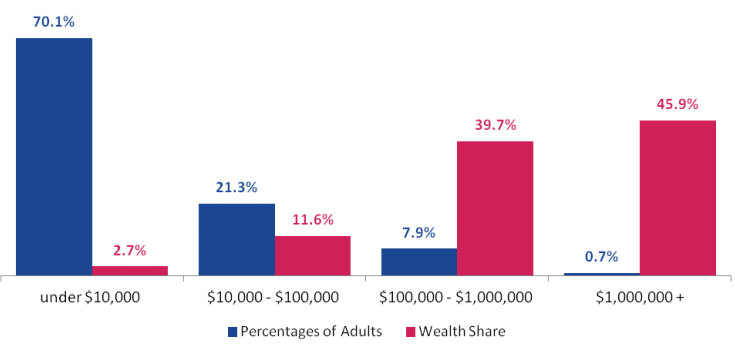
Global share of wealth by wealth group

The first necessary condition for wealth concentration is an unequal initial distribution of wealth. The distribution of wealth across the population is often well approximated by a Pareto distribution, with tails that decay as a power law in wealth. According to PolitiFact and others, the 400 wealthiest Americans had "more wealth than half of all Americans combined." Inherited wealth may help explain why many Americans who have become rich may have had a "substantial head start". In September 2012, according to the Institute for Policy Studies, "over 60 percent" of the Forbes 400 Richest Americans "grew up in substantial privilege".

The second condition is that a small initial inequality must widen over time into a larger one. This is an example of positive feedback in an economic system. A team from Jagiellonian University developed a statistical model of economies showing that wealth condensation can occur whether total wealth is growing or not (if not, it implies that some individuals are growing their wealth at the expense of others rather than creating new wealth; this could mean those experiencing poverty could become poorer).

Joseph E. Fargione, Clarence Lehman, and Stephen Polasky demonstrated in 2011 that chance alone, combined with the deterministic effects of compounding returns, can lead to unlimited concentration of wealth, such that the percentage of all wealth owned by a few entrepreneurs eventually approaches 100%.

==== Correlation between being rich and earning more ====
Given an initial condition in which wealth is unevenly distributed (i.e., a "wealth gap"), several non-exclusive economic mechanisms for wealth concentration have been proposed:

- A correlation between being rich and being given high-paid employment (oligarchy).
- A marginal propensity to consume low enough that high incomes are correlated with people who have already made themselves rich (meritocracy).
- The ability of the rich to influence government disproportionately to their favor, thereby increasing their wealth (plutocracy and regulatory capture).

In the first case, being wealthy allows one to earn more through high-paying employment (e.g., by attending elite schools). In the second case, having high-paid employment allows one to become rich (by saving one's money, since a lower percentage of it is consumed on necessities). In the third case, the wealthy exert power over the legislative process, which enables them to increase the wealth disparity by—using their economic power—lobbying for policies that benefit them. An example of this is the high cost of political campaigning in some countries, in particular in the US (more generally, see also plutocratic finance). The Center for American Progress warns that a "significant percentage" of money in politics is spent for the purpose of "capturing private favours". It also notes that "campaign contributions and lobbying often help shape policy outcomes" in ways consistent with rent seeking.

Because these mechanisms are non-exclusive, all three explanations could work together to compound the effect, further increasing wealth concentration. Obstacles to restoring wage growth might have more to do with the broader dysfunction of a dollar-dominated political system, particularly in the US, than with the role of the extremely wealthy.

Counterbalances to wealth concentration include certain forms of taxation, in particular wealth tax, inheritance tax, and progressive taxation of income. However, concentrated wealth does not necessarily inhibit wage growth for ordinary workers with low wages.

The investor, billionaire, and philanthropist Warren Buffett, one of the wealthiest people in the world, voiced in 2005 and once more in 2006 his view that his class, the "rich class", is waging class warfare on the rest of society. In 2005, Buffett said to CNN, "It's class warfare, my class is winning, but they shouldn't be." In a November 2006 interview in The New York Times, Buffett stated that "[t]here's class warfare all right, but it's my class, the rich class, that's making war, and we're winning."

== Redistribution of wealth and public policy ==
In many societies, attempts have been made, through property redistribution, taxation, or regulation, to redistribute wealth, sometimes in support of the upper class, and sometimes to diminish economic inequality.

Examples of this practice go back at least to the Roman Republic in the third century B.C., when laws were passed limiting the amount of wealth or land that any one family could own. Motivations for such limitations on wealth include the desire for equality of opportunity, a fear that great wealth leads to political corruption, the belief that limiting wealth will gain the political favor of a voting bloc, or fear that extreme concentration of wealth results in rebellion. Various forms of socialism attempt to diminish the unequal distribution of wealth and thus the conflicts and social problems arising from it.

During the Age of Reason, Francis Bacon wrote "Above all things good policy is to be used so that the treasures and monies in a state be not gathered into a few hands… Money is like fertilizer, not good except it be spread."

The rise of Communism as a political movement has partially been attributed to the distribution of wealth under capitalism, in which a few lived in luxury. In contrast, the masses lived in extreme poverty or deprivation. However, in the Critique of the Gotha Programme, Marx and Engels criticized German Social Democrats for emphasizing issues of distribution instead of production and ownership of productive property. While the ideas of Marx have nominally influenced various states in the 20th century, the Marxist notions of socialism and communism remain elusive.

On the other hand, the combination of Labour movement, technology, and social liberalism has diminished extreme poverty in the developed world today, though extremes of wealth and poverty continue in the Third World.

In the Outlook on the Global Agenda 2014 from the World Economic Forum, widening income disparities rank second among global risks. According to a 2009 meta-analysis by Paul and Moser, countries with high income inequality and poor unemployment protections experience worse mental health outcomes among the unemployed.

== See also ==
- Wealth inequality in the United States
- Distributive justice
- Desert (philosophy)
- Generational accounting
- Cycle of poverty
- Gini coefficient
- Social mobility
- Social inequality
- Economic mobility
- Economic inequality
- Kinetic exchange models of markets
  - Yard-sale model
- List of countries by financial assets
- List of countries by total private wealth
- List of countries by wealth per adult
- List of countries by wealth inequality
