= Greenwich College =

Greenwich College may refer to

- Royal Naval College, Greenwich
- Greenwich Community College
