= Asset exchange model =

In econophysics, asset exchange models (AEM) are models that simulate how wealth is distributed through asset transactions.

AEMs illustrate inequality as an emergent property of systems of stochastically interacting agents.

== List of models ==
There are several models including Additive asset exchange, Multiplicative asset exchange, Yard-sale model, and Bennati-Dragulescu-Yakovenko (BDY) game.

== See also ==
- Kinetic exchange models of markets
