= Tank controls =

Tank controls may refer to:

- Tank controls (video games)
- Tank steering systems
