= Norbar Torque =

Norbar Torque Tools
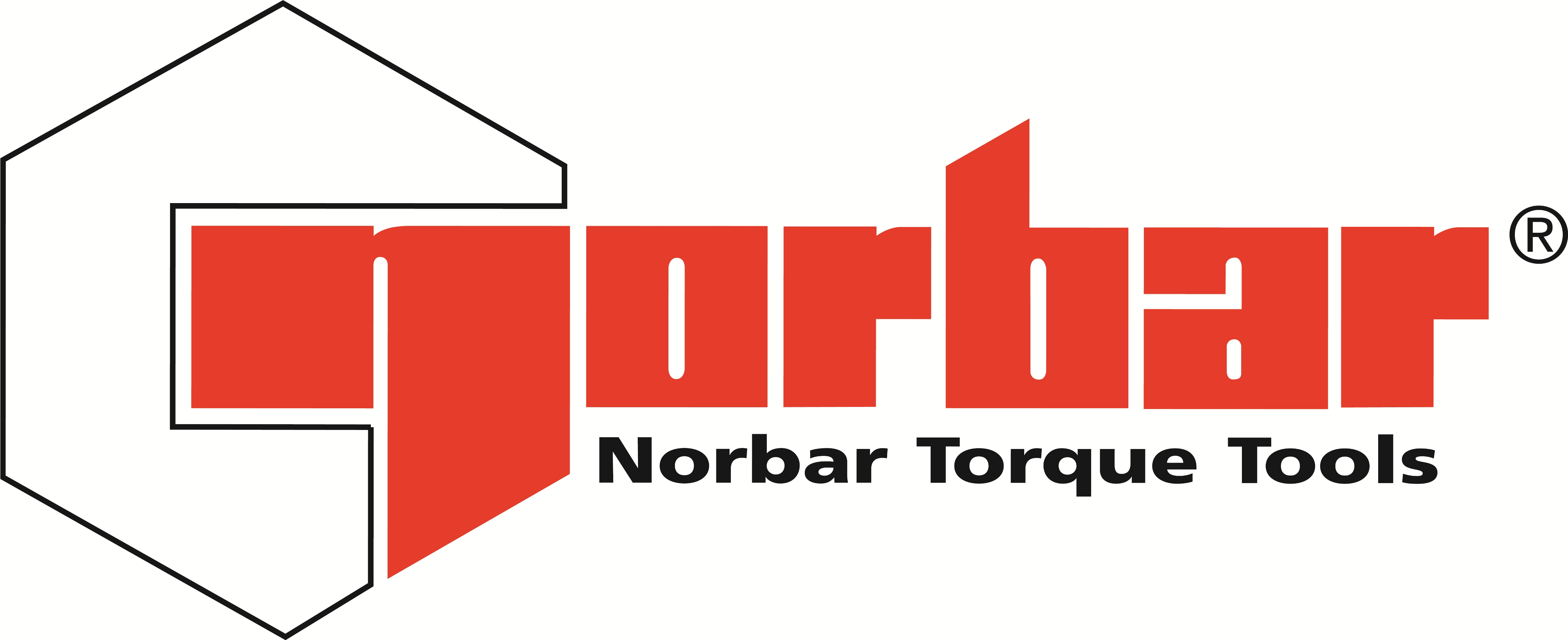
- Type: Torque Tool Manufacturer
- Founded: 1943
- Founder: William Brodey
- Headquarters: Banbury, United Kingdom
- Number of locations: United Kingdom, Australia, USA, New Zealand, China, India.
- Area served: Worldwide
- Products: Torque tools, torque measurement and calibration equipment
- Number of employees: 330 (2025)
- Parent: Snap-on Inc.
- Website: www.norbar.com

Norbar Torque Tools Ltd specialises in the manufacture and worldwide distribution of torque tools for torque tightening, measurement and calibration. The primary office and factory location is in Banbury, United Kingdom and there are also Norbar sales, service and calibration facilities in Australia, United States, New Zealand, Singapore, China and India.

== History ==
Norbar Torque Tools was owned and run by the descendants of the founder, William (Bill) Brodey until acquired by Snap-on Inc. in May 2017.

=== 1940s ===
In 1942, at the height of World War II, Bill Brodey was engaged in selling various tools and machines including Joseph Sunnen honing machines used for honing cylinder bores of engines. Torque wrenches were being imported and sold alongside of the honing machines because it was known that uneven torque tightening of engine cylinder head bolts would distort the cylinder bore. Bill and his friend Ernest Thornitt applied to the UK Ministry of Supply requesting permission to manufacture torque wrenches in the UK. Torque wrenches were much in demand for the manufacture of Rolls-Royce Merlin aero engines and the UK Government was keen to manufacture in the UK wherever possible to reduce pressure on the Atlantic supply convoys. Consequently, permission was granted to 'The North Bar Tool Company' to start manufacturing torque wrenches in 'North Bar Place', Banbury in the United Kingdom. The address 'North Bar' gave the company its name and this was later contracted to 'Norbar'.

At the end of World War II the market for the Merlin aero engine dried up, along with all of the tools used in its manufacture. The North Bar Tool Company switched its attention to the manufacture of simple household goods like tables and trays. As industry recovered, 'North Bar Tools' went back to its roots in the aerospace industry, manufacturing a range of specialist fitting tools, along with torque wrenches.

=== 1950s ===
In 1952, Bill Brodey's eldest son Ian joined the company. Ian was a graduate in mechanical engineering from Loughborough College of Technology and brought a new level of professionalism to the company's engineering activity, producing drawings for all components for the first time and expanding the product range. In 1957, Bill's younger son John joined the North Bar Tool company as the first full-time salesman.

In 1953 a project for the engineering company and bolt manufacturer GKN took the North Bar Tool Company in a new product direction. GKN had designed a bolt that had a splined section above the nut. By gripping the splined section of the bolt and counter rotating the nut, the fastener could be tightened without the need for any external reaction device. In a further development, a shear groove was placed below the spline, so designed that the bolt would fail at the groove when the pre-determined torque had been achieved. This bolting method was known as 'Torshear'. GKN required an air-driven tool capable of high torque output to sell with their 'Torshear' bolts. Probably Britain's best-known gearbox designer of the time was Dr. Henry Edward Merritt and so Dr. Merritt was contracted to design a suitable range of air-driven gearboxes for the Torshear application.

The Torshear bolting method was not a commercial success, so 'North Bar' added reaction arms to their gearboxes and called them 'Pneutorque' in the case of the air-driven versions, and the hand-operated versions were named 'Handtorque'. Evolutions of these products still form part of the company's range today. Dr. Merritt's book 'Gears' remains a reference for gearbox designers.

=== 1960s ===
Another Dr. Merritt design was the 'Slimline' torque wrench mechanism. Prior to the 'Slimline', all Norbar torque wrenches used an external, break-back mechanism. The 'Slimline' was the first Norbar design to completely contain the mechanism within the body tube of the wrench, hence the 'Slim' reference. The 'Slimline' torque wrench was launched in 1963 and some models remain in production today. Variations in this mechanism underpin most of Norbar's current torque wrenches.

Norbar has manufactured torque testers for almost as long as they have manufactured wrenches. The earliest types employed a simple spring balance attached to a pivoted bar. The next evolution was to utilise a hydraulic cell and hydraulically activated gauge. The 'Static Torque Meter' was much more compact than the earlier versions and were easier to use because this system avoided the needle fluctuations of the spring balance type. This product enjoyed a near 50 year life span before finally being rendered obsolete by electronic measurement methods.

The first reference to a Norbar electronic torque analyser is dated 1967. The display unit, incorporating an analogue gauge similar to a Voltmeter, was attached by a cable to a separate, strain gauged torque transducer. Forty five years later, this essentially remains the method of measuring torque although the electronics are now based on single-board computer technology with such features as colour display and touch sensitive screen.

=== 2010s ===
Norbar relocated their HQ and manufacturing facility to new larger premises in a phased approach starting in 2012 and completing in 2016. The company remain based in Banbury, UK

Norbar was acquired by Snap-on Inc. in 2017 for $72 million.

== Norbar premises in Banbury ==
1969 saw the company's first address change bringing with it the official change in name from 'The North Bar Tool Company' to 'Norbar' (which had previously been used as a telegraphic address). The new premises on Swan Close, Banbury, were originally 9,000 sq.ft but were extended twice before being outgrown and Norbar moved again to Beaumont Road, Banbury in 1984. A major extension to this site in 1989 took the floor area to 45,000 sq.ft and further extensions and mezzanine work give a total of 52,000 sq.ft of production and office space. In March 2012 Norbar exchanged contracts with Hella Ltd to purchase its 170,000 sq ft Wildmere Road site in a move that saw Norbar relocate completely in July 2016 and Hella move to new premises in the Banbury area.

== Calibration laboratory ==
In November 1989, Norbar became the first torque tool manufacturer in the United Kingdom to have a torque laboratory accredited by the governmental, third party body National Measurement Accreditation Service (NAMAS). In 1995 the non-profit distributing private company United Kingdom Accreditation Service (UKAS) was formed and took over this accreditation role. Norbar's laboratory, number 0256, has an accredited calibration scope from 0.005 Nּm to 108,500 Nּm.

== Global offices and calibration laboratories ==
Since 1996 Norbar has been establishing overseas offices for the purpose of product distribution and service. Norbar Torque Tools Pty. Ltd in Australia was the first and was then followed by the United States, New Zealand, Singapore and China. On 1 January 2012, Norbar's wholly owned trading and service company opened for business in Mumbai, India. The companies in Australia, USA, Singapore and China each have a calibration laboratory with a similar scope of ability to the UKAS accredited laboratory in the United Kingdom. Each of these laboratories has accreditation by a local third party body; NATA in the case of Australia, NVLAP for USA, SAC-SINGLAS for Singapore and TAF for China.

== Directors ==
The previous directors included a grandchild of the founder, Bill Brodey. Neill Brodey joined Norbar in 1987 following a degree in Mechanical Engineering from Loughborough University and having worked at Coles Cranes and Harris Graphics. He retired from the company in 2025.

== See also ==
- Electric torque wrench
- Hydraulic torque wrench
