= Bikas Chakrabarti =

Indian physicist

Bikas K. Chakrabarti
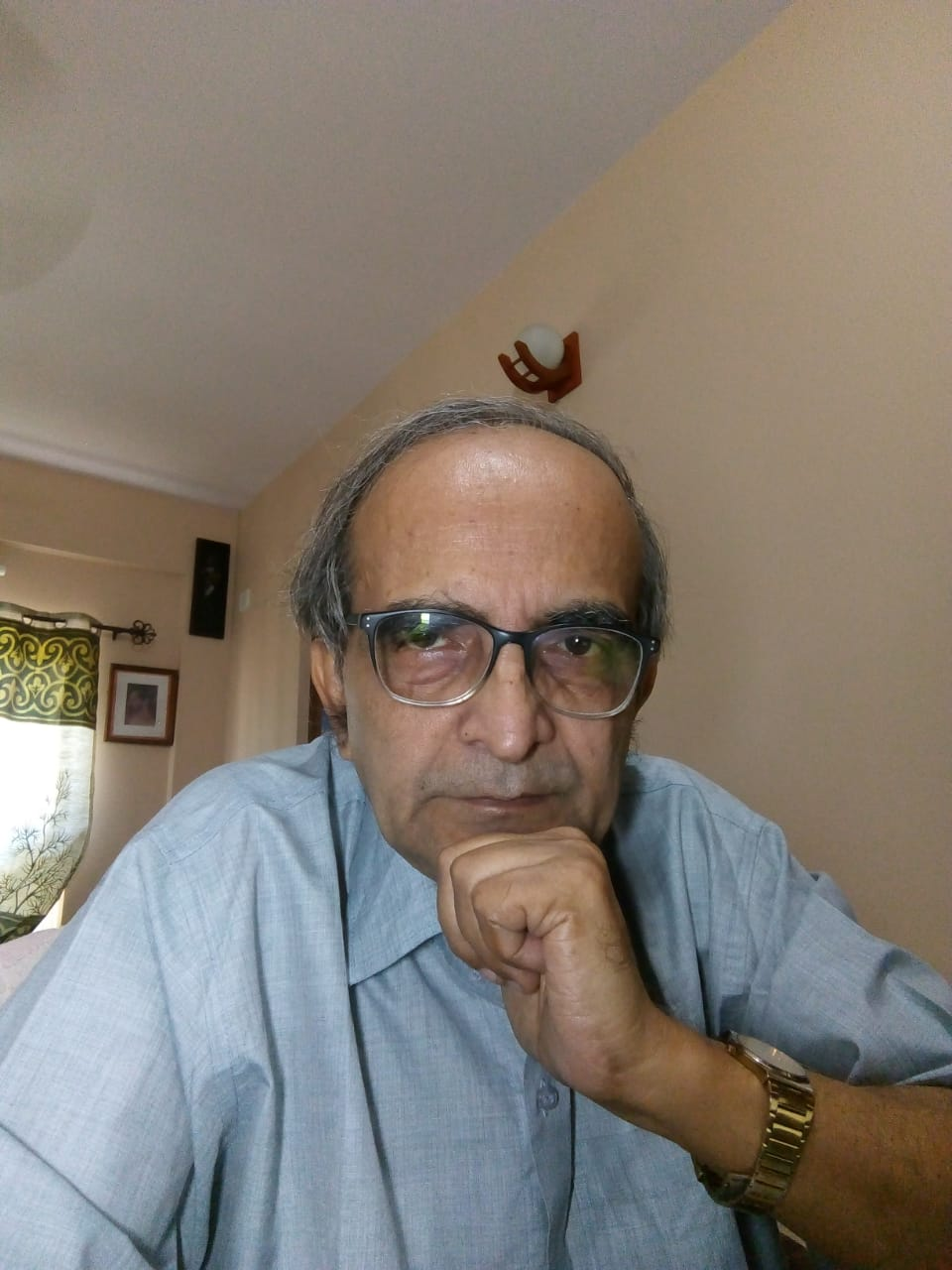
- Born: 14 December 1952 (age 73); Calcutta, India
- Education: Calcutta University
- Known for: Quantum annealing; Econophysics; Kinetic exchange models of markets
- Awards: Shanti Swarup Bhatnagar Award
- Scientific career
- Fields: Physics, Economics
- Workplaces: Saha Institute of Nuclear Physics, Kolkata; Indian Statistical Institute, Kolkata; S. N. Bose National Centre for Basic Sciences, Kolkata

Bikas Kanta Chakrabarti (born 14 December 1952 in Kolkata (erstwhile Calcutta) is an Indian physicist. At present he is Visiting Professor of Economics at the Indian Statistical Institute, Kolkata, India.

== Biography ==
Starting early 1900, the Institutions of Kolkata had many distinguished intellectual stalwarts of modern India, including physicists like Jagadish Chandra Bose, C. V. Raman, Satyendra Nath Bose, Meghnad Saha and Prasanta Chandra Mahalanobis. During Chakrabarti's University days there were inspiring teachers and scientists like Amal Kumar Raychaudhuri (best known for Raychaudhuri equation) and Chanchal Kumar Majumdar (best known for Majumdar–Ghosh model).

Chakrabarti received his Ph.D. degree from Calcutta University in 1979 (for research in Statistical Physics). Following post-doctoral work at the University of Oxford and the University of Cologne, he joined the faculty of Saha Institute of Nuclear Physics (SINP) in 1983. He is S. S. Bhatnagar Prize awardee (1997) and former J. C. Bose National Fellow (2011-2020). He is a former director of SINP. At present he is Honorary Visiting Professor of economics (2007-) at the Indian Statistical Institute. Emeritus Professor of SINP and of S.N. Bose National Centre for Basic Sciences. He was INSA Scientist (physics) at SINP (2021-2025).

Much of Chakrabarti's research has centered around statistical condensed matter physics (including Quantum annealing; see also Timeline of quantum computing) and applications to social sciences (see e.g., Econophysics). On these and related topics, he coauthored four reviews in Reviews of Modern Physics [Dynamic Transitions & Hysteresis (with M. Acharyya), RMP, 71, 847 (1999); Quantum annealing and analog quantum computation (with A. Das), RMP, 80, 1061 (2008); Failure processes in elastic fiber bundles (with A. Hansen & S. Pradhan), RMP, 82, 499 (2010); Statistical physics of fracture, friction, and earthquakes (with S. Biswas, T.Hatano, N. Kato & H. Kawamura), RMP, 84, 839 (2012)], three books from Cambridge University Press and two books from Oxford University Press (mostly with his Ph. D. students).

He was Ph. D. thesis supervisor of Anirban Chakraborti.

== Honors, awards & recognitions ==
- Young Scientist Award of Indian National Science Academy, New Delhi (1984)
- Shanti Swarup Bhatnagar Award of the Council of Scientific and Industrial Research, India (1997)
- Fellow, Indian Academy of Sciences, Bangalore (1997-)
- Fellow, Indian National Science Academy, New Delhi (2003-)
- Honorary Visiting Professor of Economics, Indian Statistical Institute, Kolkata (2007- )
- Outstanding Referee Award of the American Physical Society (2010)
- J. C. Bose National Fellow, Department of Science and Technology (India) (2011-2020)

== Books ==
- Quantum Ising Phases and Transitions in Transverse Ising Models, Bikas K. Chakrabarti, Amit Dutta and Parongama Sen, Springer-Verlag, Heidelberg (1996) [2nd Ed., with Sei Suzuki & Jun-ichi Inoue (2013)]
- Statistical Physics of Fracture and Breakdown in Disordered Solids, Bikas K. Chakrabarti and L. Gilles Benguigui, Oxford University Press, Oxford (1997)
- Econophysics: An Introduction, Sitabhra Sinha, Arnab Chatterjee, Anirban Chakraborti and Bikas K. Chakrabarti, Wiley-VCH, Berlin (2011)
- Econophysics of Income & Wealth Distributions, Bikas K. Chakrabarti, Anirban Chakraborti, Satya R. Chakravarty and Arnab Chatterjee, Cambridge University Press, Cambridge (2013)
- Sociophysics: An Introduction, Parongama Sen and Bikas K. Chakrabarti, Oxford University Press, Oxford (2014)
- Quantum Phase Transitions in Transverse Field Spin Models: From Statistical Physics to Quantum Information, Amit Dutta, Gabriel Aeppli, Bikas K. Chakrabarti, Uma Divakaran, Thomas Felix Rosenbaum & Diptiman Sen, Cambridge University Press, Cambridge (2015)
- Quantum Spin Glasses, Annealing and Computation, Shu Tanaka, Ryo Tamura & Bikas K. Chakrabarti, Cambridge University Press, Cambridge (2017)
