= Kinetic exchange models of markets =

Econophysical model

Kinetic exchange models are multi-agent dynamic models inspired by the statistical physics of energy distribution, which try to explain the robust and universal features of income/wealth distributions. The most well known example is the yard-sale model.

Understanding the distributions of income and wealth in an economy has been a classic problem in economics for more than a hundred years. Today it is one of the main branches of econophysics.

== Data and basic tools ==
In 1897, Vilfredo Pareto first found a universal feature in the distribution of wealth. After that, with some notable exceptions, this field had been dormant for many decades, although accurate data had been accumulated over this period. Considerable investigations with the real data during the last fifteen years (1995–2010) revealed that the tail (typically 5 to 10 percent of agents in any country) of the income/wealth distribution indeed follows a power law. However, the majority of the population (i.e., the low-income population) follows a different distribution which is debated to be either Gibbs or log-normal.

Basic tools used in this type of modelling are probabilistic and statistical methods mostly taken from the kinetic theory of statistical physics. Monte Carlo simulations often come handy in solving these models.

== Overview of the models ==
Since the distributions of income/wealth are the results of the interaction among many heterogeneous agents, there is an analogy with statistical mechanics, where many particles interact. This similarity was noted by Meghnad Saha and B. N. Srivastava in 1931 and thirty years later by Benoit Mandelbrot. In 1986, an elementary version of the stochastic exchange model was first proposed by J. Angle. for open online view only.

In the context of kinetic theory of gases, such an exchange model was first investigated by A. Dragulescu and V. Yakovenko. Later, scholars found that in 1988, Bennati had independently introduced the same kinetic exchange dynamics, thus leading to the nomenclature of this model as Bennati-Dragulescu-Yakovenko (BDY) game. The main modelling efforts since then have been put to introduce the concepts of savings, and taxation in the setting of an ideal gas-like system. Basically, it assumes that in the short-run, an economy remains conserved in terms of income/wealth; therefore law of conservation for income/wealth can be applied. Millions of such conservative transactions lead to a steady state distribution of money (gamma function-like in the Chakraborti-Chakrabarti model with uniform savings, and a gamma-like bulk distribution ending with a Pareto tail in the Chatterjee-Chakrabarti-Manna model with distributed savings) and the distribution converges to it. The distributions derived thus have close resemblance with those found in empirical cases of income/wealth distributions.

Though this theory had been originally derived from the entropy maximization principle of statistical mechanics, it had been shown by A. S. Chakrabarti and B. K. Chakrabarti that the same could be derived from the utility maximization principle as well, following a standard exchange-model with Cobb-Douglas utility function. Recently it has been shown that an extension of the Cobb-Douglas utility function (in the above-mentioned Chakrabarti-Chakrabarti formulation) by adding a production savings factor leads to the desired feature of growth of the economy in conformity with some earlier phenomenologically established growth laws in the economics literature. The exact distributions produced by this class of kinetic models are known only in certain limits and extensive investigations have been made on the mathematical structures of this class of models. The general forms have not been derived so far. For a recent review (in 2024) on these developments, see the article by M. Greenberg (Dept. Economics, University of Massachusetts Amherst & Systems Engineering, Cornell University) and H. Oliver Gao (Systems Engineering, Cornell University) in the last twenty five years of research on kinetic exchange modeling of income or wealth dynamics and the resulting statistical properties.

A very simple model based on the same kinetic exchange framework, where in each trade (or two-body interaction) the richer trader saves its excess wealth over that of the partner trader, was introduced by Chakraborti in 2002. The model is now popularly called the yard-sale model, because it had few features of a real one-on-one economic transactions which led to an oligarchy. The intriguing and realistic features of the extreme inequality of wealth distribution in the model, when augmented by the introduction of tax proportional to the amount of wealth exchanged in each trade, has been extensively studied and reviewed by Boghosian.

== Criticisms ==
This class of models has attracted criticisms from many dimensions. It has been debated for long whether the distributions derived from these models are representing the income distributions or wealth distributions. The law of conservation for income/wealth has also been a subject of criticism.

== See also ==
- Economic inequality
- Econophysics
- Thermoeconomics
- Wealth condensation
