= Yard-sale model =

Economic model showing fair trading leads to inequality

The yard-sale model, also known as the yard sale effect, is a kinetic exchange market model in which agents repeatedly exchange wealth in random pairs, with the amount at stake set by the wealth of the poorer participant, akin to a garage sale where people exchange goods and money. In its standard form, the model is a closed and wealth-conserving system, yet repeated fair exchanges drive the distribution of wealth toward extreme concentration. This consistent result among variations, parameterizations, and related models have made the yard-sale model one of the most widely discussed models in econophysics, and a frequently discussed economic model of wealth redistribution.

Researchers have used principles of physics to connect the model's simple trading rule to equations that describe how wealth spreads across an entire population. A large body of research examines how policies such as redistribution, taxation, risk limits, and wealth-attained advantage can alter the unequal outcomes the model produces. Because the basic model produces extreme inequality even when every trade is fair, it is often used as a mathematical argument for policies that redistribute wealth, including forms of wealth taxation, in discussions of wealth concentration.

== Description ==
The yard-sale model got its name from Brian Hayes, who used it in a 2002 overview of models where people trade wealth in pairs, comparing the exchanges to bargaining at a yard sale. In the standard setup, the number of people and the total amount of wealth in the economy stay fixed, so the model focuses purely on how the rules of trading affect inequality, not on things like economic growth or population change. Later reviews place the yard-sale model after the foundational random asset-exchange papers of 2000, which built the broader framework for this type of physics-based economic modeling. The specific trading rule now associated with the yard-sale model is most often traced to Chakraborti's 2002 model, in which the amount exchanged depends on the poorer agent's wealth, while Brian Hayes's survey later that same year helped make the name "yard-sale model" widely known.

A standard version of the model starts with everyone holding the same amount of wealth, then repeatedly picks random pairs of people to trade with. If two people with wealths $w_i$ and $w_j$ meet, the amount traded is commonly written as $\Delta = \gamma \min(w_i,w_j)$, where $0<\gamma<1$ is a fixed fraction of the poorer person's wealth. A fair coin flip then decides the winner, who gains $\Delta$, while the loser gives up the same amount, so the total wealth in the system never changes.

These individual trading rules give rise to a mathematical model that describes the wealth of an entire population over time. Researchers use physics models to show how individual trades between two people cause broad patterns of wealth concentration. Boghosian derived Fokker–Planck equations for the wealth density in the yard-sale model and related asset exchange models, and later work also treated the model through Boltzmann-type equations and probabilistic approximations. In these approaches, the key imbalance is not in the odds of winning, which are equal for both sides, but in the fact that the size of each trade is tied to the poorer person's wealth.

The most well-known result of the basic model is wealth condensation: even though each trade is fair, after many rounds of trading, nearly all the wealth ends up with one person or a very small group. Eventually, one person ends up with almost everything (a Gini coefficient of 1), and the wealth gap keeps widening.

Historically, the yard-sale model is part of a broader set of physics-inspired economic models that grew out of comparisons between trading in markets and the way gas molecules collide and exchange energy. Later reviews treat the yard-sale model as one of the central examples in that body of work because it shows especially clearly how a simple trading rule can produce extreme inequality even when everyone starts equal.

== Variations and comparisons to other models ==
Many later versions of the model add explicit redistribution. In the taxed versions studied by Boghosian and Chorro, redistributing some wealth from richer people to the rest of the population can replace total wealth concentration with steady distributions that follow a Pareto tail over part of the wealth range. Another influential extension introduces wealth-attained advantage, a built-in edge for the richer person in each trade; in that case, redistribution and this pro-rich bias work against each other, and a strong enough advantage can bring back oligarchic concentration.

Other variants change how much risk each person takes in a trade rather than who has the edge. Giordano and co-authors studied versions in which the most a person can lose in a single transaction is capped, and found that limiting risk can greatly reduce inequality compared to the standard yard-sale rule. Lima, Vieira, and Anteneodo similarly looked at nonlinear redistribution taxes, including both progressive and regressive schemes, and showed that the resulting wealth distributions and levels of inequality depend heavily on which tax rule is used.

Network versions of the yard-sale model drop the assumption that anyone can trade with anyone, instead allowing trades only between people connected in a graph. Computer simulations on one-dimensional rings, two-dimensional grids, and random networks found that the stable phase looks similar to the basic model, but that in the unstable phase wealth does not pile up with just one person — instead it concentrates among a larger set of people whose characteristics depend on how the network is structured. These network versions are used to study how local connections between people change the tipping point between wealth sharing and wealth concentration.

Compared with other kinetic exchange models, the yard-sale model stands out for the extent to which it magnifies inequality. In models that include saving rates or other stabilizing features, wealth distributions can settle into stable, spread-out shapes, whereas the basic yard-sale model tends toward monopoly. So while later models such as the affine wealth model are often considered more realistic, the yard-sale model remains the standard example for showing how simple trading rules can create extreme inequality.

== Economic implications ==
Lorenz curve for US wealth distribution in 2016 showing negative wealth and oligarchy

Personal wealth and tax rate changes in the U.S.

The average personal wealth for people in the top 1% of the US is more than 1000 times that of people in the bottom 50%.

Effective total tax rates in the United States, for the richest, bottom 90%, and bottom 50% of Americans.

The model's main economic lesson is that large wealth inequality can arise naturally from decentralized trading even when every trade is perfectly fair. In that sense, the yard-sale model is often used to push back on the idea that unequal outcomes must come from unfair rules, because the rules in this model treat both sides the same, while the long-run results are deeply unequal.

The reason this happens is path dependence. Once a person has lost wealth, their future trades are smaller in dollar terms, making it harder to recover. Meanwhile, people who have built up wealth can keep trading larger amounts and win larger gains in absolute terms. The model therefore turns small, random early advantages into lasting differences in wealth, making inequality self-reinforcing even without any rule that explicitly favors the rich.

This feature has made the yard-sale model a common reference point in mathematical discussions of oligarchy and extreme concentration. In the basic model, inequality does not just fluctuate — the Gini coefficient moves only in one direction, meaning wealth inequality grows steadily and never levels off on its own. Later work proved related bounds on how fast the model moves toward oligarchy in modified versions. The model is therefore often read as a formal demonstration that unregulated exchange can be structurally unstable with respect to wealth equality.

Because redistribution changes those outcomes, the yard-sale model is also used in arguments for redistributive policy. In published research, proportional, nonlinear, and progressive taxes on wealth or capital are introduced precisely because the untaxed model concentrates wealth too severely; these taxes can produce stable wealth distributions and lower measured inequality compared to the basic case. For that reason, discussions of the model often treat it as a stylized argument for the economic rationale of a wealth tax: without some mechanism to move wealth back toward those who have less, the model's own dynamics push wealth toward oligarchy.

At the same time, the yard-sale model is a deliberately simplified model rather than a direct description of real economies. It leaves out production, innovation, wages, savings, inheritance, institutions, debt, and many other forces that shape real-world wealth distributions. Its value in the study of inequality lies in showing, in the clearest possible setting, how trading rules alone can produce lasting wealth concentration and why policymakers add redistribution, risk limits, or other institutions to prevent that result.

== See also ==
- Economic inequality
