= Earle Buckingham =

American engineer

Earle Buckingham (September 4, 1887 in Bridgeport, Connecticut-June 3, 1978 in Springfield, VT) was an American mechanical engineer and pioneer in the theory of gears.

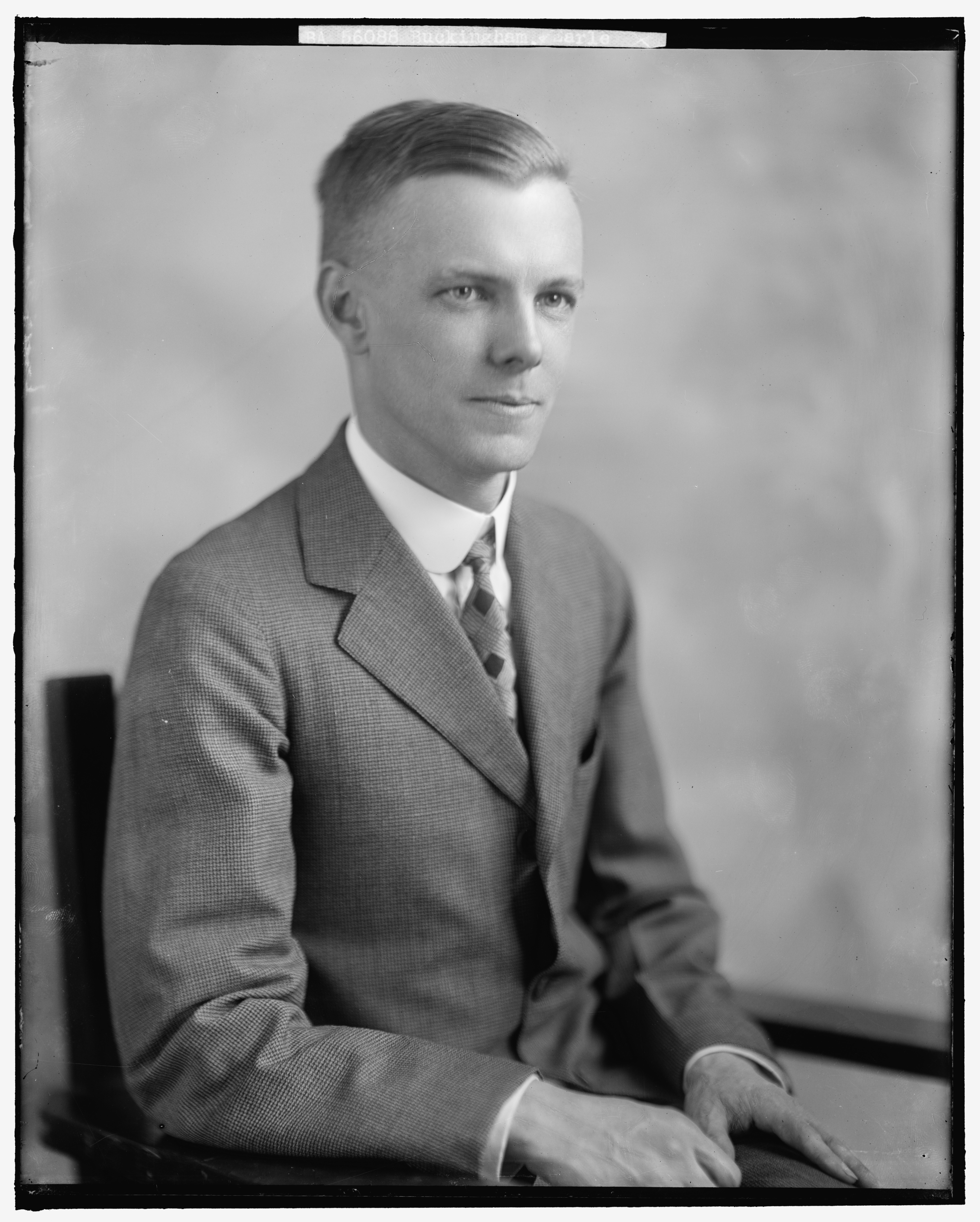

Buckingham was one of the founders of the theory of gearing and gear design and made significant contributions to this area. His monographs gained him international recognition in addition to the great respect he had already earned in English-speaking countries.

Buckingham was born in 1887 in Bridgeport, Connecticut. He attended the United States Naval Academy in Annapolis, Maryland from 1904 to 1906 and then began to work in industry. In 1919, he directed his research and science interests to the field of gears, initially as a gear consultant for the Niles-Bement-Pond Company (now Pratt & Whitney) and then from 1925 to 1954 as a professor of mechanical engineering at the Massachusetts Institute of Technology in Cambridge, Massachusetts. After retirement, he continued his research activity as a gear consultant.

Buckingham’s books (e.g., Analytical Mechanics of Gears, 1963) laid the foundation for the theory of gearing and became references for at least two generations of engineers and researchers. The engineering community recognized his contributions to the design and theory of gears by presenting him these prestigious awards: the American Society of Mechanical Engineers (ASME) Worcester Reed Warner Medal, 1944; the American Gear Manufacturers Association (AGMA) Edward P. Connel Award, 1950; the American Society of Test Engineers (ASTE) Gold Medal, 1957; the Gold Medal of the British Gear Manufacturers Association, 1962; and the Golden Gear Award of Power Transmission Design magazine in commemoration of the AGMA 50th Anniversary. Also in recognition of his contributions, Buckingham lectures are delivered at the USA Power Transmission and Gearing conferences.

In 1925 Earle Buckingham was among of the first persons who conducted studies about the measurement of noise, in his case of gear boxes. In close collaboration with Floyd A. Firestone, he published two articles, one in the 1925 Summer meeting of the Society of Automotive Engineers, and the other in the November SAE Journal.

Retrieved from . Development of gear Technology and Theory of Gearing.

Faydo L. Litvin. Nasa Reference Publication 1406. ARL-TR-1500

== Awards ==
- American Society of Mechanical Engineers (ASME) Worcester Reed Warner Medal, 1944
- American Gear Manufacturers Association (AGMA) Edward P. Connel Award, 1950
- American Society of Test Engineers (ASTE) Gold Medal, 1957
- Gold Medal of the British Gear Manufacturers Association, 1962
- Golden Gear Award of Power Transmission Design magazine in commemoration of the AGMA 50th Anniversary.

== Selected publications ==
- Principles of interchangeable manufacturing. The Industrial Press, New York, c.1921.
- Involute spur gears. Niles-Bement-Pond Co., New York, c.1922.
- Spur gears: Design, operation, and production. McGraw-Hill, New York, 1928.
- Dynamic loads on gear teeth. American society of Mechanical Engineers, New York, 1931.
- Dimensions and tolerances for mass production. Industrial Press, New York, 1954.
- Design of worm and spiral gears: A manual for the design and manufacture of all-recess-action worm and spiral gear drives. Industrial Press, New York, c.1960. (With Henry H. Ryffel)
- Analytical Mechanics of Gears. 1963.
