= Inclusive wealth =

Aggregate value of all capital assets in a given region

Inclusive wealth is the aggregate value of all capital assets in a given region, including human capital, social capital, public capital, and natural capital. Maximizing inclusive wealth is often a goal of sustainable development. The Inclusive Wealth Index is a metric for inclusive wealth within countries: unlike gross domestic product (GDP), the Inclusive Wealth Index "provides a tool for countries to measure whether they are developing in a way that allows future generations to meet their own needs".

The United Nations Environment Programme (UNEP) published reports in 2012, 2014, and 2018 on inclusive wealth. The 2018 "Inclusive Wealth Report" found that, of 140 countries analyzed, inclusive wealth increased by 44% from 1990 to 2014, implying an average annual growth rate of 1.8%. On a per capita basis, 89 of 140 countries had increased inclusive wealth per capita. 96 of 140 countries had increased inclusive wealth per capita when adjusted. Roughly 40% of analyzed countries had stagnant or declining inclusive wealth, sometimes despite increasing GDP. Many countries showed a decline in natural capital during this period, fueling an increase in human capital.

== Inclusive Wealth Index ==
Inclusive Wealth Index (IWI)
- Formation: 2012
- Headquarters: United Nations Environment Programme, Nairobi, Kenya
- Parent organization: United Nations Environment Programme
- Website: https://www.unep.org/resources/report/inclusive-wealth-report-2018

The Inclusive Wealth Index (IWI) was developed by UNEP in partnership with Kyushu University. The Index calculation is based on estimating stocks of human, natural and produced (manufactured) capital which make up the productive base of an economy. Biennial Inclusive Wealth Reports (IWR) track progress on sustainability across the world for 140 countries. The IWI is UNEP's metric for measuring intergenerational well-being. Implementing the IWI has been undertaken by many individual countries with UNEP support by a scientific panel headed by Sir Partha Dasgupta of Cambridge University.

Inclusive wealth is complementary to Gross Domestic Product (GDP). In a 'stocks and flows' model, capital assets are stocks, and the goods and services provided by the assets are flows (GDP). A tree is a stock; its fruit is a flow, while its leaves provide a continuous flow of services by pulling carbon dioxide from the atmosphere to store as carbon. It is a multi-purpose indicator capable of measuring traditional stocks of wealth along with skill sets, health care, and environmental assets that underlie human progress. The effective management of this capital supports the ultimate purpose of an economy – societal well-being.

=== Conceptual framework ===
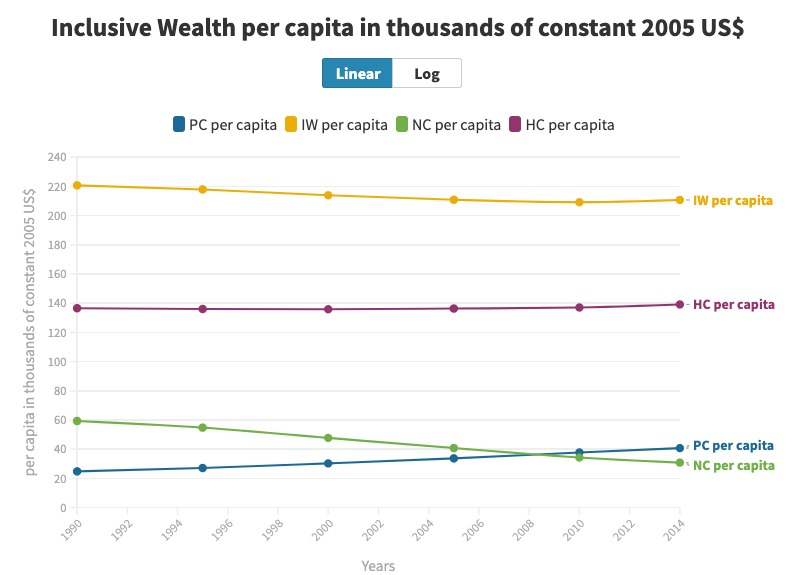
Trends in inclusive wealth, produced, human, and natural capital.

Produced capital (also referred to as manufactured capital) includes investment in roads, buildings, machines, equipment, and other physical infrastructure. Human capital comprises knowledge, education, skills, health and aptitude. Natural capital includes forests, fossil fuels, fisheries, agricultural land, sub-soil resources, rivers and estuaries, oceans, the atmosphere and ecosystems, more generally. Social capital includes trust, the strength of community and institutions, and the ability of societies to overcome problems. An economy's institutions and politics determine the social value of its assets because they influence what people are able to enjoy from them. IWI does not directly measure social capital, which is considered to be embedded in other capital types. Not all components of capital that are conceptually components of wealth are currently included in the Inclusive Wealth methodology. This is due to difficulties in measuring certain assets, as well as data availability and comparability constraints.

=== Methodology ===
The conceptual framework looks at well-being at time t as:

$V(t)=\int_{t}^{\infty} U(C_\tau)e^{-\delta(\tau-t)} d\tau$

Denoting produced, human, and natural capital as 𝐾, 𝐻, and 𝑁, the change in inclusive wealth 𝑊 is expressed by:

$dW=(K,H,N,t)/dt= p_k (dK/dt) + p_H(DH/dt) + p_N (dN/dt) \delta V/\delta N$

where 𝑝_{𝐾}, 𝑝_{𝐻} and 𝑝_{N} are the marginal shadow prices of produced, human, and natural capital, respectively. They are formally defined by,

$p_K \equiv \partial V/\partial K, p_H\equiv \partial V/ \partial H, p_N \equiv \partial V /\partial N$

given a forecast of how produced, human, and natural capital, as well as other flow variables, evolve in the economy in question.

Practically, shadow prices act as a weight attached to each capital, resulting in the measure of wealth, or:

$IWI = p_K (K)+ p_H(H)+p_N(N)$

In practice, W and IWI can be used interchangeably, although they can differ in that IWI also uses shadow prices on the margin. In addition, the unit of IWI is monetary rather than utility.

This does not affect the sustainability assessment overall.

==== Natural capital ====
The components of natural capital include renewable resources (agricultural land, forests, and fisheries) and nonrenewable resources (fossil fuels and minerals).

The inclusion of fossil fuels within an indicator that tracks sustainability may appear counterintuitive because fossil fuels are often considered liabilities or stranded assets. The mechanism assumed in the IWI framework is the business-as-usual scenario of the imperfect economies that form the basis of our societies. The shadow price of any type of natural capital represents its marginal contribution towards social wellbeing. In this context, the potential benefit of fossil fuels for driving investment in other types of capital outweighs the drawbacks of the social costs of carbon.

===== Non-renewable resources =====
Non-renewable natural capital resources are oil, coal, natural gas, minerals and metals. To measure a fossil fuel, data measures the stock and is compared to data from other years, in order to develop a time series that reflects accurate flows. The unit shadow price for non-renewables is the price net of extraction cost, also called the rental price. The rental rate of the total price is assumed constant.

===== Renewable resources =====
====== Timber ======
Timber stocks included in IWI estimates are those that are commercially available. To calculate the quantity of timber available, the total forest area, excluding cultivated forest[3], is multiplied by the timber density per area and percentage of total volume that is commercially available. The exclusion of cultivated forest from this category is debatable, as it is regarded as contributing to timber and non-timber values. Forest cultivation is categorized as a production activity in the System of National Accounts.

Following the estimation of physical stocks, shadow prices are computed to convert the wealth into monetary terms. The World Bank's approach uses a weighted average price of two commodities for industrial roundwood and fuelwood. Country-specific GDP deflators are used to convert prices from current to constant units, and regional rental rates for timber are applied, which are assumed to be constant over time. To obtain the proxy value for the shadow price of timber, the average price over the study period (1990 to 2014) is taken. Wealth corresponding to timber value is taken as the product of quantity, price and average rental rate over time.

====== Non-timber forest benefits ======
Aside from the provisional ecosystem service of timber production, forests yield many other services. These additional ecosystem services are accounted for in the following manner: Non-cultivated forest area is retrieved from FAO (2015). The fraction of the forest area that contributes to human well-being is assumed to be 10%. The unit benefit of non-timber forest to inter-temporal social well-being is obtained from the Ecosystem Service Valuation Database (ESVD) database. This is expressed as USD/ha/year. Finally, to translate this benefit into capital asset value, we take its net present value, using the discount rate of 5%.

====== Fishery stocks ======
Fishery stocks cannot be estimated based on habitat area, unlike forest or agricultural lands. Marine fishery habitats often cross national borders. Global fish stocks are often assessed using trends in catch or harvest data. With a country's harvest and effort data, along with a catchability coefficient, stocks can be estimated using the Schefer production function. For estimating fishery stocks in countries that lack sufficient effort data, a resource dynamic approach is taken.

====== Agricultural land ======
Agricultural land is composed of cropland and pastureland. Data from Food and Agriculture Organization (2015) is employed to quantify cropland and pastureland area. Market prices are often unavailable for agricultural land. A shadow price is computed as the net present value of the annual flow of services per hectare, in line with World Bank (2011). IWI assumes the shadow price of pastureland is equal to that of cropland.

==== Shadow price ====
Shadow prices are the estimated price of a good or a service that does not have a market price. The calculation of shadow prices is central to the IWI, particularly for natural capital. Various non-market valuation techniques provide estimates for these prices. The use of shadow prices for natural capital is controversial, mainly regarding the knowledge gap surrounding how to represent production functions of life-supporting ecosystems. Nevertheless, shadow prices based on willingness to pay measures are considered the best available approach for estimating their value.

==== Human capital ====
The main components of human capital are health and education, but also parenting, on-the-job training, informal education and migration.

Human health is affected by daily well-being, productivity and lifespans. The latter is computed as a proxy for health-related human capital, largely because the options for quantifying the others are limited. The shadow price of health capital is the value of a statistical life year (VSLY).

IWI methodology focuses on the return on formal education, acknowledging that non-formal education such as early childhood learning and vocational training also contribute to wealth. Using data from Barro and Lee (2013), educational attainment is proxied by the average years of schooling per person. The rate of return on education is assumed to be 8.5%, and then multiplied by the educated population.

==== Produced capital ====
Produced capital, also referred to as manufactured capital, includes physical infrastructure, land, facilities of private firms, and dwelling places. IWI uses the perpetual inventory method (PIM), which is a simple summation of gross investment net of depreciation that occurs in each period.

==== Adjustments ====
Three adjustments influence wealth and social well-being, but are not covered by the official capital assets: carbon damage, oil capital gains, and total factor productivity.

Carbon damage can be regarded mostly as an exogenous change in social well-being. Calculation involves:

- Obtain global carbon emissions for the period under analysis (1990 to 2014);
- Derive global damage as a function of emissions; and
- Allocate global damage to countries according to their potential effect on global warming.

Oil prices are notorious for rapid fluctuations. Oil-rich nations benefit from spiking oil prices. Conversely, rising oil prices may result in reductions in social well-being for oil importing countries. An annual increase of 3% in the price of oil is assumed, corresponding to the annual average oil price increase during 1990–2014, implying that even if no oil is withdrawn, a nation can enjoy 3% growth in wealth.

Total factor productivity (TFP) measures residual contributions to social well-being. IWI includes TFP as an adjustment term. A non-parametric analysis called Malmquist productivity index is employed, which is based on the concept of data envelopment analysis.

== History ==
IWI was inaugurated in 2012 with the launch of the Inclusive Wealth Report (IWR) at the United Nations Conference on Sustainable Development (Rio+20). IWR 2012 compared the relative change of natural capital against produced capital and human capital. The results showed that changes in natural capital can significantly impact a nation's well-being, and that it is therefore possible to trace changes in components of wealth by country and link these to economic progress. The 2014 and 2018 IWRs expanded scope to cover 140 countries. The main focus of IWR 2014 was to estimate the education component of human capital. In IWR 2018, health was added to human capital, and fisheries were added to natural capital.

Changes in inclusive wealth are calculated using 25 year annual average growth rates. The results show that the growth of inclusive wealth is positive for many countries. Top performers include Republic of Korea, Singapore and Malta among others. However, in many countries, the population is growing more quickly than the inclusive wealth. These places experienced negative per capita wealth growth. Some of the negative per capita growth of wealth occurred in countries that experienced absolute gains in wealth.

IWI looks at each country's assets and assesses the changing health of these assets over 25 years. IWR 2018 shows that 44 out of the 140 countries have suffered a decline in inclusive wealth per capita since 1992, even though GDP per capita increased in all but a handful of them. This statistic shows that their growth is unsustainably depleting resources.

== Inclusive Wealth Index and Sustainable Development Goals ==
Sustainable Development Goal (SDG) 17 calls for developing "measurements of progress on sustainable development that complement GDP." The inclusive wealth index is one way of measuring progress on the SDGs and positive development trajectories.

Infrastructure and industrialization can occur in line with sustainability considerations. On a global level, produced capital per capita has experienced the largest increase compared to human and natural capital, often at the expense of the latter. The IWI framework provides data and guidance in monitoring the trade-offs without compromising other development goals.

IWI provides governments a new and holistic guide. If inclusive wealth (adjusted for population and wealth distribution) increases as governments try to meet SDGs, the SDGs will be sustainable; if it declines, the SDGs will be unsustainable. It could be that the goals are reached, but are not sustainable because the development paths that nations choose to follow erode their productive capacities.

== 2018 Inclusive Wealth Index ==
Table 1 Top performers on the basis of per capita inclusive wealth for 1992-2014
IWI Ranking	Country	Average growth per capita 1992-2014
1	Republic of Korea	33.0%
2	Singapore	25.2%
3	Malta	18.9%
4	Latvia	17.9%
5	Ireland	17.1%
6	Moldova	17.0%
7	Estonia	16.0%
8	Mauritius	15.5%
9	Lithuania	15.2%
10	Portugal	13.9%
