= Brian Hayes (scientist) =

American scientist, columnist and author (born 1949)

Brian Hayes (born December 10, 1949) is an American scientist, columnist and author.

Hayes is a senior writer and regular columnist for the magazine American Scientist, and was editor in chief for the magazine from 1990 to 1992. He has also edited and written columns for Scientific American, as well as writing for Computer Language and The Sciences. He won a National Magazine Award for his essay "Clock of Ages" in 2000.

Hayes is the author of three books:

- Infrastructure: A Field Guide to the Industrial Landscape (W. W. Norton, 2005, ISBN 978-0-393-32959-9; revised and updated edition: W.W. Norton, 2014, ISBN 978-0393349832).
- Group Theory in the Bedroom, and Other Mathematical Diversions (Hill and Wang, 2008; Macmillan, 2009, ISBN 978-0-8090-5217-2).
- Foolproof, and Other Mathematical Meditations (MIT Press, 2017, ISBN 9780262036863

== See also ==
- Yard-sale model
