= London South East Colleges =

Location
- Rookery Lane; Bromley, BR2 8HE; England; 51°23′13″N 0°02′06″E

Information
- Type: Further education, higher education
- Established: 1907-2016 – founding institutions 2016 – London South East Colleges
- Local authority: Bromley, Bexley, Greenwich
- Department for Education URN: 130430 Tables
- Ofsted: Reports
- Principal: Sam Parrett
- Staff: 650+
- Gender: Mixed
- Age: 16+
- Enrolment: 10,000+ (2019)
- Website: www.lsec.ac.uk

Bromley College of Further and Higher Education, trading as London South East Colleges (LSEC), is a large college of further education and higher education operating in south-east London, England. It is a partner college of six of the twelve schools of the University of Greenwich. LSEC was established in 2016 by the amalgamation of Bromley College, Greenwich Community College and Bexley College. Its largest campus is in the town of Bromley, and others are situated in Erith, Plumstead and Orpington.

== History and sites ==
=== Bromley and Orpington ===
The Bromley campus is just south of Bromley town centre on the A21. Bromley College was founded in 1959. On 1 August 2011, it merged with Orpington College, which became its Orpington campus. Built in 1972, Orpington College's tower block remains the tallest building in Orpington. A World War II air-raid shelter was discovered in November 2008 during construction. This shelter would have housed Orpington residents from German bombing raids, and was buried when the Walnuts Shopping Centre was built.

The old Bromley College logo

Beginning in 2008, the Bromley campus it underwent a £26m overhaul. Buildings, dating back more than 30 years were demolished and a new hi-tech, eco-friendly four-storey block built, while the existing 10-storey block was refurbished. The new building houses a study and IT centre. The new library includes a quiet room and there is a new student common room. Following a competition held by the college, the new building was named "The Ozone" by winning student, Martin Baker. It was officially opened on 14 April 2011 by the mayor, accompanied by Jason Donovan, who unveiled a plaque.

On 1 August 2016, Bromley College of Further & Higher Education merged with Bexley College and Greenwich Community College to become London South East Colleges. London South East Colleges is the trading name of Bromley College of Further and Higher Education, which is still the legal name.

=== Greenwich ===
The old GCC logo

The Greenwich campus of LSEC is on Plumstead Road between Woolwich and Plumstead. In its 2010 Ofsted inspection the college was judged "satisfactory" overall, with Sports, Leisure and Tourism, and ESOL provision rated as "good".

This college was originally founded in 1921 as Woolwich College of Further Education. In 1998, Woolwich College amalgamated with Greenwich Community College to deliver the Adult and Community Learning contract for the London Borough of Greenwich. Greenwich Community College became part of LSEC in 2016.

=== Bexley ===
The Bexley campus of LSEC is in Erith. It dates back to 1906 when the building was built to a design by architect William Egerton, and then opened in 1907 as 'Erith Technical Institute'. It is on the residential Erith Road, on the last part of the ridge, in the east of the district on the border of Erith, at the junction of Erith Road and Upper Holly Hill Road. The building was for a time shared with Erith County School.

It was formerly known as Erith College of Technology (ECOT) running Ordinary National Diplomas OND in Technology & Ordinary National Certificates ONC as well as Higher National Certificates HNC in Electrical & Electronic Engineering alongside A Levels and other vocational courses in Mechanical Engineering, Beauty, Hairdressing, Management and Construction.

The former St Joseph's Campus at 269 Woolwich Road (A206) near Bostall Heath in Abbey Wood used to be the St Joseph's Convent Grammar School, a Catholic girls' school until 1979; there also was the Main Road campus in Sidcup. Both sites were sold off for housing developments principally to earn revenue for the College. In 1971, a new campus was built on Tower Road in Belvedere and became known as Bexley College in 1993. The Grade II listed Holly Hill Campus offers engineering and construction courses.

In 2014, the new main campus opened in Erith town centre, near to the station in Stonewood Road / Walnut Tree Road. The previous main campus at Tower Road in Belvedere was closed and as of October 2014 is being redeveloped by the new owners to provide housing. The Walnut Tree Road campus in Erith was built to be eco friendly with biomass boilers, LED lighting and rainwater flushing for the toilets. Bexley College merged with Bromley and Greenwich colleges in 2016 and thus became the Bexley campus of LSEC.

In popular culture, the E4 drama Misfits is filmed in Thamesmead. Many scenes take place around Southmere Lake and Bexley College was once also used as a setting.

== Academic organisation ==
In further education the college offers a wide variety of vocational courses A new Hospitality, Food & Enterprise College opened in September 2014 at the Orpington Campus. Bromley College opened up a commercial training restaurant which is now open to the public.

Bromley College partnerships with the University of Greenwich and Canterbury Christ Church University enable them to offer a range of courses providing higher education opportunities.

The Bromley Children's University was launched in September 2014, with initial support from the National Children's University, a national programme aimed at increasing social mobility and aspiration among children.

== Notable alumni ==
- Hanif Kureishi CBE – Writer, studied at Bromley College.
- Peter Whittle AM – Member of the London Assembly, founder and director of the New Culture Forum, and former deputy leader of the UK Independence Party, studied at Bromley College
- Gemma Gibbons – London 2012 Olympic Judo Silver Medallist, studied (2004–06) at Greenwich Community College
- Sam Bailey, Bexley College
- Neal Lawson, Bexley College
- H. E. Merritt (1899-1974), Bexley College
- Linda Smith, stand-up comic and Radio 4 and BBC2 comedian, Bexley College
- Kate Bush CBE, musician famous for Wuthering Heights, studied piano and violin at St Joseph's Convent Grammar School
- Jan Leeming (née Atkins), stalwart 1980s and 1990s newsreader on BBC News, studied at St Joseph's Convent Grammar School
- David Evennett, Conservative MP for Bexleyheath and Crayford and former MP for Erith and Crayford from 1983–97, was a teacher at Bexley College
- Mark Fisher, writer and theorist, taught at Orpington College

== See also ==
- List of UCAS institutions
- List of universities in the United Kingdom
