= Orrell (surname) =

The surname Orrell may refer to the following people:

- David Orrell (born 1962), Canadian mathematician
- Eddie Orrell (born 1965), Canadian politician in Nova Scotia
- Joe Orrell (1917–1993), baseball player
- John Orrell (1934–2003), author, theatre historian, and English professor
- John Orrell Lever (1824–1897), English shipping owner and politician
- Marc Orrell (born 1982), American guitarist
- Richard Orrell (1875–1919), English footballer
- Timothy Orrell (born 1967), English cricketer

== See also ==
- Orrell (disambiguation)
