= Quantum social science =

Interdisciplinary study of quantum physics and sociology

Quantum social science is an emerging field of interdisciplinary research that draws parallels between quantum physics and the social sciences. Although there is no settled consensus on a single approach, a unifying theme is that, while the social sciences have long modelled themselves on mechanistic science, they can learn much from quantum ideas such as complementarity and entanglement. Some authors are motivated by quantum mind theories that the brain, and therefore human interactions, are literally based on quantum processes, while others are more interested in taking advantage of the quantum toolkit to simulate social behaviours which elude classical treatment. Quantum ideas have been particularly influential in psychology but are starting to affect other areas such as international relations and diplomacy in what one 2018 paper called a "quantum turn in the social sciences".

== History ==
The idea that quantum physics might play an important role in living systems has long been considered by physicists. Niels Bohr for example believed that his principle of complementarity extended into both biology and psychology, while Erwin Schrödinger wrote in his 1944 book What is Life? of a "quantum theory of biology" that saw genetic mutations in terms of quantum leaps. In his 1989 book The Emperor's New Mind, Roger Penrose hypothesized that quantum mechanics plays an essential role in human consciousness. His 1994 follow-up book Shadows of the Mind speculated that these quantum processes occur in microtubules within neurons.

Some physicists have also been willing to consider an even more direct connection between mind and quantum matter, in a quantum version of panpsychism. In his 1975 book Disturbing the Universe, Freeman Dyson wrote that "mind is already inherent in every electron, and the processes of human consciousness differ only in degree but not in kind from the processes of choice between quantum states". David Bohm's 1951 book Quantum Theory included a chapter on "Analogies to Quantum Processes" where he considered applications including the understanding of thought processes, and in 1990 he published a paper named "A new theory of the relationship of mind and matter" which asserts that consciousness permeates all forms of matter. These ideas were popularised and extended by Danah Zohar in books including The Quantum Self and (with Ian Marshall) The Quantum Society. Karen Barad's 2007 book Meeting the Universe Halfway took "Niels Bohr's philosophy-physics" as a starting point to develop her theory of agential realism.

Beginning in the 1990s, a separate approach to quantum social science was taken by some interdisciplinary researchers, working in what became known as quantum cognition, who argued that quantum probability theory was better than classical probability theory at accounting for a range of cognitive effects of the sort studied in behavioral economics. Others worked on developing "weak" or "generalised" versions of quantum theory which extended concepts such as complementarity and entanglement to the social domain. In their 2013 book Quantum Social Science, Emmanuel Haven and Andrei Khrennikov developed mathematical formalisms for the application of quantum models to topics including psychology, economics, finance, and brain science.

Most researchers in areas such as quantum cognition view the quantum formalism solely as a mathematical toolbox, and do not assume that human cognition is physically based on quantum mechanics. Separately however, researchers in quantum biology have uncovered evidence of quantum effects being exploited in processes such as photosynthesis and avian navigation; and some authors, notably political scientist Alexander Wendt, have argued that human beings are literally what he calls "walking wave functions".

== Core ideas ==
While quantum social scientists are divided on whether social processes are physically quantum in nature or merely amenable to a quantum approach, there are a number of common ideas, themes, and concerns. The most fundamental point is that, since its inception, social science has been based on a classical worldview that needs to be updated in accordance with the teachings of quantum physics. In particular, quantum theory disputes key tenets or assumptions of the social sciences, which, according to Wendt, include materialism, determinism, and mechanism.

An example is the notion of entanglement. In mechanistic or pre-quantum science, particles are seen as individual entities that interact only in a mechanistic sense. In quantum mechanics, particles such as electrons can become entangled so that a measurement on one instantly affects the state of the other. In quantum social science, people are similarly entangled, whether through shared institutions such as language or (according to some interpretations) through actual physical processes. An implication is that people are never completely separable, but are entangled elements of society.

Another example is the idea of wave function collapse. In standard interpretations of quantum physics, a particle is described by a wave function, and attributes such as position or momentum are only determined through a measurement procedure that collapses the wave function to one of a set of allowed states. In quantum social science, mental states are best described as potentialities that "collapse" only when a judgement or decision is made. One consequence of wave function collapse in physics is that a measurement affects the system being studied, and therefore any future measurement. A corresponding phenomenon in social science is the so-called order effect, where responses to survey questions depend on the order in which they are asked.

== Applications ==
Ideas from quantum physics have long inspired thinkers in areas such as politics, diplomacy, and international relations. The journalist Flora Lewis spoke of the "Quantum Mechanics of Politics" in 1975. In a 1997 lecture on "Diplomacy in the Information Age", former US Secretary of State George P. Shultz credits the physicist Sidney Drell for coining the term "quantum diplomacy" to describe how diplomats need to account for uncertainty and the fact that "the process of observation itself is a cause of change". In a 2011 paper, James Der Derian proposed quantum diplomacy as a way to understand the entanglements brought about by a globalized media and a multiplicity of actors operating at different levels. These ideas have been a theme of Der Derian's annual Q-Symposium since 2014. In a 2018 address to the Trilateral Commission, Danah Zohar argued that a mechanistic worldview has led to problems from inequality to climate change, and that we need to shift to a quantum perspective which incorporates effects such as uncertainty and entanglement.

While Wendt's 2015 book Quantum Mind and Social Science does not focus on political science, it does discuss the applicability of quantum theory to social systems in general, and its publication has led to extensive analysis and discussion on this topic. Other related areas where quantum ideas are seeing applications include quantum game theory, quantum decision theory, quantum finance and quantum economics. In a 2019 article for the Bretton Woods Committee, Andrew Sheng wrote that "A quantum paradigm of finance and the economy is slowly emerging, and its nonlinear, complex nature may help the design of a future global economy and financial architecture."

== Criticism ==
Quantum social science is contested by critics, who argue that it inappropriately imports ideas from quantum physics into the social domain. The most common criticism is that due to quantum decoherence, quantum effects are filtered out at the macroscopic level, so cannot affect social systems. The physicist Max Tegmark for example has argued that brains cannot sustain quantum coherence.

A related point of controversy is whether quantum science should be applied to social systems only metaphorically, or whether it should be taken as a physical description of those systems. This in turn relates to a broader debate in the sciences about scientific realism, which applies also to quantum physics.

== See also ==
- Quantum mysticism
