= Horrell =

Horrell is a surname. Notable people with the surname include:

- Horrell Brothers, five brothers from Texas who were outlaws of the Old West
- Andrew Horrell (born 1988), New Zealand rugby union player
- Edita Horrell, Lithuanian mountaineer and humanitarian aid worker
- Edwin C. Horrell (1902–1992), American football player and coach
- Elizabeth Horrell (1826–1913), New Zealand teacher and homemaker
- Grace Horrell (born 2001), Welsh footballer
- Ryan Horrell (born 1973), former English cricketer

== See also ==
- Horrell Hill, South Carolina, in Lower Richland County, South Carolina
- Orrell (disambiguation)
