= Economyths =

Economics book

Economyths: Ten Ways Economics Gets It Wrong
- Wiley hardcover edition
- Author: David Orrell
- Language: English
- Subject: Economics
- Genre: Non-fiction
- Publisher: Icon Books and John Wiley & Sons
- Publication date: July 2010
- Media type: Print, e-book
- Pages: 288 pp
- ISBN: 978-1848311480
- OCLC: 665817373
- Dewey Decimal: 338
- LC Class: HB3722.O77 2010

Economyths is a book by the mathematician David Orrell about the problems with mainstream economics, written for the general reader. The book was initially published in 2010 by Icon Books in the UK with the subtitle Ten Ways That Economics Gets it Wrong, and by John Wiley & Sons in North America. Icon published a revised version in 2012, with the subtitle How the Science of Complex Systems Is Transforming Economic Thought. Translated versions were also published in Brazil, China, Japan, and Korea. In 2017, Icon published a revised and expanded version with the subtitle 11 Ways Economics Gets it Wrong.

== Summary ==
The book has ten chapters, each of which concentrates on a separate “economyth”. These are summarized on p. 6 as follows:

1. The economy can be described by economic laws.

2. The economy is made up of independent individuals

3. The economy is stable

4. Economic risk can be easily managed using statistics

5. The economy is rational and efficient

6. The economy is gender-neutral

7. The economy is fair

8. Economic growth can continue forever

9. Economic growth will make us happy

10. Economic growth is always good

In each case, Orrell explains the role that the myth plays in economics, discusses the problems it creates, and proposes solutions and alternatives based on ideas from areas such as complexity, network theory, nonlinear dynamics, heterodox economics, and so on.

The 2017 extended version included a new chapter on the idea that

11. The economy boils down to barter

This chapter included a summary of Orrell's quantum theory of money and value. In addition, there was a foreword by Cahal Moran (co-author of The Econocracy), and an appendix The Five Stages of Economic Grief on how the economics profession is coming to terms with its role in the great financial crisis, which was excerpted in Evonomics.

== Reviews ==
In a Bloomberg piece on business books, economist William White said that the book “Lists 10 crucial assumptions (the economy is simple, fair, stable, etc.) and argues both entertainingly and convincingly that each one is totally at odds with reality. Orrell also suggests that adopting the science of complex systems would radically improve economic policymaking.”

The economist Robert Nelson wrote in the International Journal of Social Economics that the book suffered from a number of omissions, in particular a fuller exploration of “the religious roles played by neo-classical economics.” However he concludes that “Whatever its omissions and other failings, much of the book is devoted to making a strong case for one very important finding – the intellectual poverty of neo-classical economics... A wide audience including many non-economists could benefit from reading it.”

In National Review, economist Michael Yates also noted some omissions, such as a discussion of worker organisation, but wrote that the book “makes sound recommendations that economists utilize methods of analysis and techniques that have proven their worth in other fields of study... Economists ignore such research at their peril.”

The economist and business journalist Norbert Häring wrote in Handelsblatt that Orrell's background as a mathematician allowed him “to question credibly and convincingly the claim of economics for quasi-scientific objectivity and mathematical precision.”

Writing at the economics blog Worthwhile Canadian Initiative, economist Frances Woolley described the writing as “just random... it never really gets further than just a semi-articulated idea,” and economist Kevin Milligan wrote that the “level of criticism in this book is juvenile.”

The economist Chris Auld described the book in a blog review as "a terrible, willfully ignorant, deeply anti-intellectual book" and said that Orrell's "characterization of economic thought presented is ridiculous... there is nothing an interested layman could possibly learn from this book." He noted a number of times in which he claimed Orrell misrepresents economics as a discipline and the views of economists.

Writing at the Popular Science book site, the science writer Brian Clegg wrote that “There are other books taking on economics, but I've not come across another that explains it so well for the layperson, takes in the credit crunch, totally destroys the validity of economics as we know it and should be required reading for every politician and banker. No, make that every voter in the land.”
