= David Orrell =

Canadian writer and mathematician

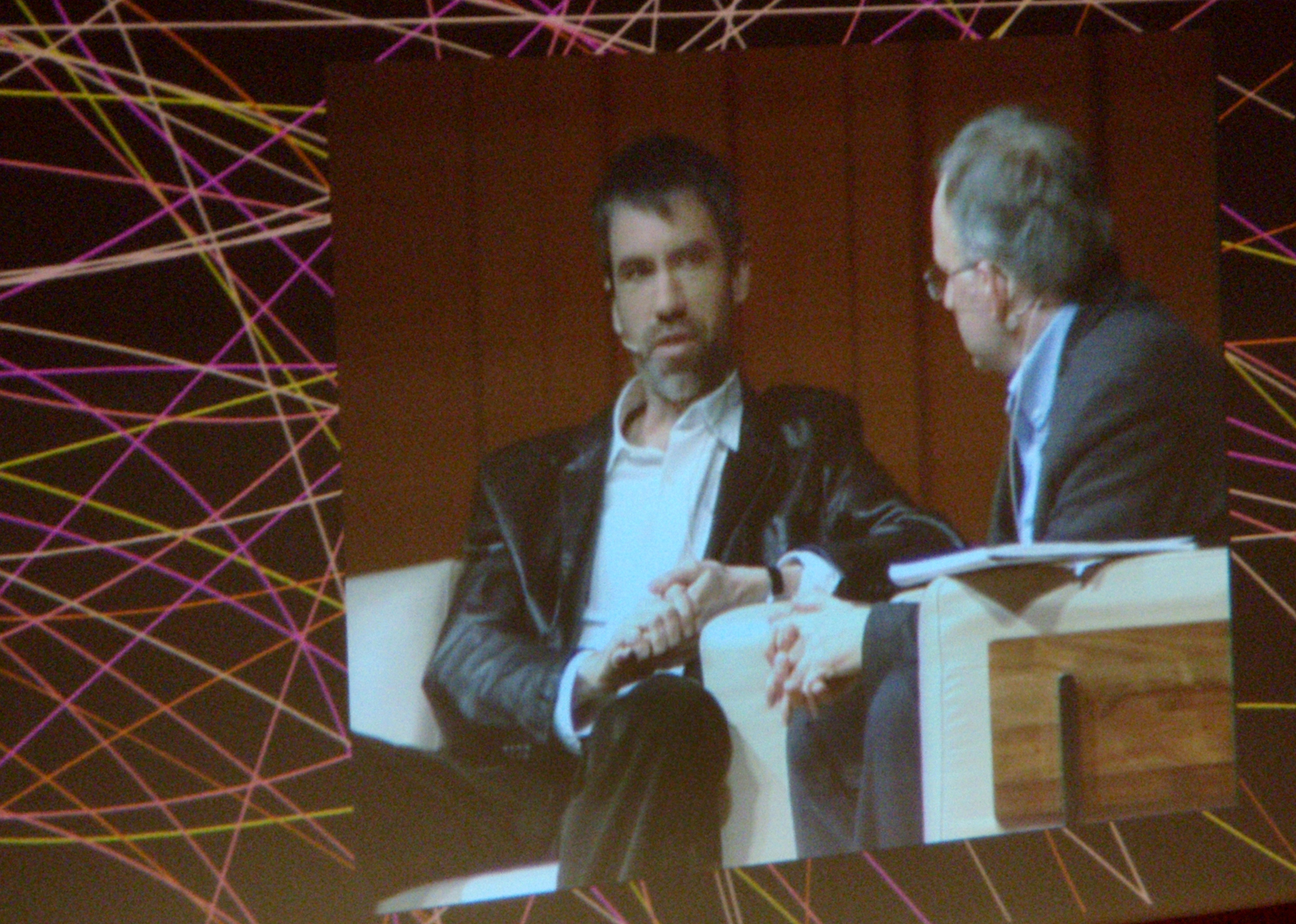
David Orrell (left) speaking with Robert Matthews at the Art Center Global Dialogues, Barcelona, 2008

David John Orrell is a Canadian writer and mathematician. He received his doctorate in mathematics from the University of Oxford. His work in the prediction of complex systems such as the weather, genetics and the economy has been featured in New Scientist, the Financial Times, The Economist, Adbusters, BBC Radio, Russia-1, and CBC TV. He now conducts research and writes in the areas of systems biology and economics, and runs a mathematical consultancy Systems Forecasting. He is the son of theatre historian and English professor John Orrell.

His books have been translated into over ten languages. Apollo's Arrow: The Science of Prediction and the Future of Everything was a national bestseller and finalist for the 2007 Canadian Science Writers' Award. Economyths: Ten Ways Economics Gets It Wrong was a finalist for the 2011 National Business Book Award.

== Criticism of use of mathematical models ==
A consistent topic in Orrell’s work is the limitations of mathematical models, and the need to acknowledge these limitations if we are to understand the causes of forecast error. He argues for example that errors in weather prediction are caused primarily by model error, rather than the butterfly effect. Economic models are seen as particularly unrealistic. In Truth or Beauty: Science and the Quest for Order, he suggests that many such theories, along with areas of physics such as string theory, are motivated largely by the desire to conform with a traditional scientific aesthetic, that is currently being subverted by developments in complexity science.

== Quantum theory of money and value ==
Orrell is considered a leading proponent of quantum finance and quantum economics. In The Evolution of Money (coauthored with journalist Roman Chlupatý) and a series of articles he proposed a quantum theory of money and value, which states that money has dualistic properties because it combines the properties of an owned and valued thing, with those of abstract number. The fact that these two sides of money are incompatible leads to its complex and often unpredictable behavior. In Quantum Economics: The New Science of Money he argued that these dualistic properties feed up to affect the economy as a whole.

== Books ==
- Orrell, David (2023). Quantum Economics and Finance: An Applied Mathematics Introduction (3rd ed.). Panda Ohana. ISBN 978-1916081611.
- Orrell, David (2022). Money, Magic, and How to Dismantle a Financial Bomb: Quantum Economics for the Real World. Icon. ISBN 978-1785788284.
- Orrell, David (2021). Instant Economics: Key Thinkers, Theories, Discoveries and Concepts. Welbeck. ISBN 978-1787394193.
- Orrell, David (2021). Behavioural Economics: Psychology, Neuroscience, and the Human Side of Economics. Icon. ISBN 978-1785786440.
- Orrell, David (2020). A Brief History of Money: 4,000 Years of Markets, Currencies, Debt and Crisis. Welbeck. ISBN 978-1785788284.
- Orrell, David (2018). Quantum Economics: The New Science of Money. Icon. ISBN 978-1785782299.
- Orrell, David (2017). Economyths: 11 Ways Economics Gets It Wrong. Icon. ISBN 978-1848311480. Revised and extended edition of 2010 book.
- Wilmott, Paul; Orrell, David (2017). The Money Formula: Dodgy Finance, Pseudo Science, and How Mathematicians Took Over the Markets. Wiley. ISBN 978-1119358619.
- Orrell, David; Chlupatý, Roman (2016). The Evolution of Money. Columbia University Press. ISBN 978-0231173728.
- Orrell, David (2012). Truth or Beauty: Science and the Quest for Order. Yale University Press. ISBN 978-0300186611.
- Sedlacek, Tomas; Orrell, David; Chlupatý, Roman (2012). Soumrak Homo Economicus. 65th Square. ISBN 978-8087506073.
- Orrell, David; Van Loon, Borin (2011). Introducing Economics: A Graphic Guide. Icon. ISBN 978-1848312159.
- Orrell, David (2010). Economyths: Ten Ways Economics Gets It Wrong. Icon. ISBN 978-1848311480.
- Orrell, David (2008). The Other Side of the Coin: The Emerging Vision of Economics and Our Place in The World. Key Porter. ISBN 978-1552639818.
- Orrell, David (2008). Gaia. Lulu.com. ISBN 978-1409255178.
- Orrell, David (2007). Apollo's Arrow: The Science of Prediction and the Future of Everything. HarperCollins. ISBN 978-0002007405. Published in the U.S. as The Future of Everything: The Science of Prediction.

== See also ==
- Anticipatory science forecasts
- Complex systems
- Mathematical model
- Computer model
- Chaos theory
- Systems biology
- Quantum economics
