= Ofer Azar =

Israeli professor of economics

Ofer H. Azar (Hebrew: עופר עזר) is an economics professor at Ben-Gurion University of the Negev in Beersheba, Israel. From 2013-2021 he was the editor-in-chief of the Journal of Behavioral and Experimental Economics. He received his Ph.D. in economics from Northwestern University. He does research in behavioral economics and industrial organization, among other fields. For example, he has published numerous studies on the practice of tipping. These studies include one which estimated that Americans tip about $42 billion per year at full-service restaurants.
