= Quantum finance =

Subfield of econophysics which applies quantum theory to finance

Quantum finance is an interdisciplinary research field that applies theories and methods developed by quantum physicists and economists to finance. It is a branch of econophysics.

== History ==
In 1978, Pakistani economist Asghar Qadir was the first to suggest that quantum physics is better suited to modelling human economic activity, because a variable does not have a single 'true state'. A 'true state', in an economic context, means a value determined by a fixed measurement, such as a transaction price or a bid, since the state is in superposition before the measurement. Quantum economic research rapidly accelerated in the 21st century: a Google Scholar search revealed that only 50 studies published between 1978-1999 mentioned quantum economic topics. From 2000-2022, 3430 such studies were published.

== Quantum continuous model ==
Most quantum option pricing research typically focuses on the quantization of the classical Black–Scholes–Merton equation from the perspective of continuous equations like the Schrödinger equation. Emmanuel Haven builds on the work of Zeqian Chen and others, but considers the market from the perspective of the Schrödinger equation. The key message in Haven's work is that the Black–Scholes–Merton equation is really a special case of the Schrödinger equation where markets are assumed to be efficient. The Schrödinger-based equation that Haven derives has a parameter ħ (not to be confused with the complex conjugate of h) that represents the amount of arbitrage that is present in the market resulting from a variety of sources including non-infinitely fast price changes, non-infinitely fast information dissemination and unequal wealth among traders. Haven argues that by setting this value appropriately, a more accurate option price can be derived, because in reality, markets are not truly efficient.

This is one of the reasons why it is possible that a quantum option pricing model could be more accurate than a classical one. Belal E. Baaquie has published many papers on quantum finance and even written a book that brings many of them together. Core to Baaquie's research and others like Matacz are Richard Feynman's path integrals.

Baaquie applies path integrals to several exotic options and presents analytical results comparing his results to the results of Black–Scholes–Merton equation showing that they are very similar. Edward Piotrowski et al. take a different approach by changing the Black–Scholes–Merton assumption regarding the behavior of the stock underlying the option. Instead of assuming it follows a Wiener–Bachelier process, they assume that it follows an Ornstein–Uhlenbeck process. With this new assumption in place, they derive a quantum finance model as well as a European call option formula.

Other models such as Hull–White and Cox–Ingersoll–Ross have successfully used the same approach in the classical setting with interest rate derivatives. Andrei Khrennikov builds on the work of Haven and others and further bolsters the idea that the market efficiency assumption made by the Black–Scholes–Merton equation may not be appropriate. To support this idea, Khrennikov builds on a framework of contextual probabilities using agents as a way of overcoming criticism of applying quantum theory to finance. Luigi Accardi and Andreas Boukas again quantize the Black–Scholes–Merton equation, but in this case, they also consider the underlying stock to have both Brownian and Poisson processes.

== Quantum binomial model ==
Chen published a paper in 2001, where he presents a quantum binomial options pricing model or simply abbreviated as the quantum binomial model. Metaphorically speaking, Chen's quantum binomial options pricing model (referred to hereafter as the quantum binomial model) is to existing quantum finance models what the Cox–Ross–Rubinstein classical binomial options pricing model was to the Black–Scholes–Merton model: a discretized and simpler version of the same result. These simplifications make the respective theories not only easier to analyze, but also easier to implement on a computer.

=== Multi-step quantum binomial model ===
In the multi-step model the quantum pricing formula is:

$$C_0^N=\mathrm{tr}[(\bigotimes_{j=1}^{N}\rho_j){[S_N-K]}^+]$$,

which is the equivalent of the Cox–Ross–Rubinstein binomial options pricing model formula as follows:

$$C_0^N=(1+r)^{-N}\sum_{n=0}^{N}\frac{N!}{n!(N-n)!}q^n{(1-q)}^{N-n}
{[S_0{(1+b)}^n{(1+a)}^{N-n}-K]}^+$$.

This shows that assuming stocks behave according to Maxwell–Boltzmann statistics, the quantum binomial model does indeed collapse to the classical binomial model.

Quantum volatility is as follows as per Keith Meyer:

$$\sigma=\frac{\ln{(1+x_0+\sqrt{x_1^2+x_2^2+x_3^2})}}{\sqrt{1/t}}$$.

==== Bose–Einstein assumption ====
Maxwell–Boltzmann statistics can be replaced by the quantum Bose–Einstein statistics resulting in the following option price formula:

$$C_0^N=(1+r)^{-N}\sum_{n=0}^{N}\left(\frac{q^n{(1-q)}^{N-n}}{\sum_{k=0}^{N}q^k{(1-q)}^{N-k}}\right){[S_0{(1+b)}^n{(1+a)}^{N-n}-K]}^+$$.

The Bose–Einstein equation will produce option prices that will differ from those produced by the Cox–Ross–Rubinstein option pricing formula in certain circumstances. This is because the stock is being treated like a quantum boson particle instead of a classical particle.

== Quantum algorithm for the pricing of derivatives ==
Patrick Rebentrost showed in 2018 that an algorithm exists for quantum computers capable of pricing financial derivatives with a square root advantage over classical methods. This development marks a shift from using quantum mechanics to gain insight into functional finance, to using quantum systems (in this case, quantum computers), to perform those calculations.

In 2020, David Orrell proposed an option-pricing model based on a quantum walk which can run on a photonics device.

== Criticism ==
In their review of Baaquie's work, Arioli and Valente point out that, unlike Schrödinger's equation, the Black-Scholes-Merton equation uses no imaginary numbers. Since quantum characteristics in physics like superposition and entanglement are a result of the imaginary numbers, Baaquie's numerical success must result from effects other than quantum ones. Rickles critiques Baaquies's work on economics grounds: empirical economic data are not random, so they don't need a quantum randomness explanation.
