= Emmanuel Haven =

Canadian academic and author

- Occupations: Academic, author and researcher

Academic background
- Education: B.A., Economics; M.A., Economics; Ph.D., Finance
- Alma mater: McGill University; Concordia University

Emmanuel Haven is an academic, author and researcher. He previously held a personal Chair at the University of Leicester (UK) and is currently full professor and the Dr. Alex Faseruk Chair in Financial Management at the Faculty of Business Administration, Memorial University.

Haven focuses his research on interdisciplinary fields with particular attention to apply formalisms from other disciplines (like physics) to areas such as economics, psychology, biology and finance. He is also the co-author of several books notably Quantum Social Science (Cambridge University Press), joint with Andrei Khrennikov and Quantum methods in social science: a first course (World Scientific), joint with Andrei Khrennikov and Terry Robinson. He has co-edited several books such as Foundations of Probability and Physics – 6 (American Institute of Physics), The Handbook of Post Crisis Financial Modelling, The Palgrave Handbook of Quantum Models in Social Science (both at (Palgrave-Macmillan-Springer Nature)).

Haven is a member of the Council of the International Quantum Structures Association (IQSA), an Co-Editor for Economics: The Open-Access, Open-Assessment Journal (De Gruyter).

== Education ==
Haven received his Bachelor’s and Master’s degree in Economics from McGill University, where he was the recipient of the James McGill Award. He then enrolled at Concordia University and earned a Doctoral degree in Finance.

== Career ==
Haven started his career in 2000 as an Assistant Professor of Finance at the University of Essex, and was promoted to Associate Professor in 2003. In 2007, he joined the University of Leicester as an Associate Professor of Finance, and became a Full Professor with a personal Chair in 2008. He held his next appointment in 2017 as a Full Professor and Alex Faseruk Chair in Financial Management at the Faculty of Business Administration, Memorial University.

Haven is a member of the board of the International Center for Mathematical Modelling (ICMM) at Linnaeus University (Sweden), and a co-founder and Secretary of IQSCS (Centre for Quantum Social and Cognitive Science) at the University of Leicester (UK).

== Research ==
Haven’s research focuses on concepts regarding Physics, Finance and Economics. He has also co-edited several special issues notably in Journal of Mathematical Economics; International Journal of Theoretical Physics; Frontiers in Physics; Frontiers in Psychology and Quantum Reports. He has also co-edited special issues in Journal of Mathematical Psychology; and Philosophical Transactions of the Royal Society A. He was co-organizer (jointly with Andrei Khrennikov; Jerome Busemeyer; Arkady Plotnitsky; Ehti Dzhafarov and Emmanuel Pothos) of the conference Quantum probability and the mathematical modelling of decision making at the Field’s Institute (University of Toronto) and other conferences.

Haven has worked on the usage of quantum mechanical concepts in the context of social science. He studied the implications of a wave function in the formulation of the (finite state space) financial non-arbitrage theorem. In his study regarding quantum formalism in social sciences, he demonstrated how elements of the formalism of quantum mechanics can be helpful in solving and re-interpreting social science problems, and suggested several applications of pilot-wave theory in terms of financial economics and of Expected utility theory (EUT) in terms of economic modeling.

In other research, Haven has explored the power of the wavelet method in the de-noising of option pricing data, while using Monte Carlo simulations.

== Awards and honors ==
- Co-founder and secretary of IQSCS, University of Leicester
- Member, Full College of the Engineering and Physical Sciences Research Council (EPSRC) (United Kingdom)
- Member of the board of the International Center for Mathematical Modelling (ICMM) at Linnaeus University (Sweden)
- Member, the Council of the International Quantum Structures Association (IQSA)

== Bibliography ==
=== Books ===
- Foundations of Probability and Physics – 6 (American Institute of Physics 1424) (2012) ISBN 978-0735410046
- Quantum Social Science (Cambridge University Press) (2013) ISBN 978-1107012820
- The Handbook of Post Crisis Financial Modelling (Palgrave MacMillan) Springer Nature (2015) ISBN 978-1137494498
- Quantum Methods In Social Science: A First Course (World Scientific) (2017) ISBN 9781786342768
- The Palgrave Handbook of Quantum Models in Social Science (Palgrave MacMillan Springer-Nature Handbook Series) (2017) ISBN 978-1137492760
- Quantum Interaction: 7th International Conference, QI 2013, Leicester. Lecture Notes in Computer Science (Springer) (2014) ISBN 978-3642549434

=== Selected articles ===
- Haven, E. (2005). Pilot-wave theory and financial option pricing. International Journal of Theoretical Physics, 44(11), 1957-1962.
- Khrennikov, A. Y., & Haven, E. (2009). Quantum mechanics and violations of the sure-thing principle: The use of probability interference and other concepts. Journal of Mathematical Psychology, 53(5), 378-388.
- Haven, E., Khrennikov, A., Ma, C. & Sozzo, S. (2018). Quantum Probability Theory and its Economic Applications. Special Issue. Journal of Mathematical Economics, 78, 127-197.
- Aerts, D., Haven, E. & Sozzo, S. (2018). A proposal to extend expected utility in a quantum probabilistic framework. Economic Theory, 65, 1079-1109.
- Robinson, T., Haven, E. & Fry, A. (2017). Quantum counting: operator methods for discrete population dynamics with applications to cell division. Progress in Biophysics and Molecular Biology, (130, 106-119).
- Haven, E., Liu, X., & Shen, L. (2012). De-noising option prices with the wavelet method. European Journal of Operational Research, 222(1), 104-112.
