= Martingale pricing =

Martingale pricing is a pricing approach based on the notions of martingale and risk neutrality. The martingale pricing approach is a cornerstone of modern quantitative finance and can be applied to a variety of derivatives contracts, e.g. options, futures, interest rate derivatives, credit derivatives, etc.

In contrast to the PDE approach to pricing, martingale pricing formulae are in the form of expectations, which can be efficiently solved numerically using a Monte Carlo approach. As such, martingale pricing is preferred when valuing high-dimensional contracts, such as a basket of options. On the other hand, valuing American-style contracts is troublesome and requires discretizing the problem (making it like a Bermudan option) and only in 2001 F. A. Longstaff and E. S. Schwartz developed a practical Monte Carlo method for pricing American options.

== Measure theory representation ==
Suppose the state of the market can be represented by the filtered probability space,$(\Omega,(\mathcal{F}_{t})_{t\in[0,T]},\tilde{\mathbb{P}})$. Let $\{S(t)\}_{t\in[0,T]}$ be a stochastic price process on this space. One may price a derivative security, $V(t,S(t))$ under the philosophy of no arbitrage as,

$$D(t)V(t,S(t))=\tilde{\mathbb{E}}[D(T)V(T,S(T))|\mathcal{F}_t], \qquad dD(t)=-r(t)D(t) \ dt$$

Where $\tilde{\mathbb{P}}$ is the risk-neutral measure.

$(r(t))_{t\in [0,T]}$ is an $\mathcal{F}_t$-measurable (risk-free, possibly stochastic) interest rate process.

This is accomplished through almost sure replication of the derivative's time $T$ payoff using only underlying securities, and the risk-free money market (MMA). These underlyings have prices that are observable and known. Specifically, one constructs a portfolio process $\{X(t)\}_{t\in[0,T]}$ in continuous time, where he holds $\Delta(t)$ shares of the underlying stock at each time $t$, and $X(t)-\Delta(t)S(t)$ cash earning the risk-free rate $r(t)$. The portfolio obeys the stochastic differential equation

$$dX(t)=\Delta(t) \ dS(t) + r(t)(X(t)-\Delta(t)S(t)) \ dt$$

One will then attempt to apply Girsanov theorem by first computing $\frac{d\tilde{\mathbb{P}}}{d\mathbb{P}}$; that is, the Radon–Nikodym derivative with respect to the observed market probability distribution. This ensures that the discounted replicating portfolio process is a Martingale under risk neutral conditions.

If such a process $\Delta(t)$ can be well-defined and constructed, then choosing $V(0,S(0))=X(0)$ will result in $\tilde{\mathbb{P}}[X(T)=V(T)] = 1$, which immediately implies that this happens $\mathbb{P}$-almost surely as well, since the two measures are equivalent.

== See also ==
- Brownian model of financial markets
- Martingale (probability theory)
