= János Kertész =

Hungarian physicist

János Kertész is a Hungarian physicist known for his contributions to the fields of econophysics, complex networks, and the application of fractal geometry in physical problems. He has played a pioneering role in these areas, expanding the understanding and applications of statistical physics and complex systems.

== Education and academic background ==
Kertész completed his Diploma in Physics in 1976 from Eötvös University in Budapest. He was awarded a Fellowship of the Hungarian Academy of Sciences from 1976 to 1978. In 1980, he earned his Dr. rer nat. with a thesis on the atomic dynamics of simple liquids under the supervision of Prof. T. Geszti at the Institute of Technical Physics of the Hungarian Academy of Sciences. He achieved his Doctor of Physical Sciences (D.Sc.) in 1989 from the Hungarian Academy of Sciences.

== Career and research ==
Kertész's career began as a Junior Scientist at the Institute of Technical Physics in 1978. He served in various capacities at the institute until 1993, ultimately becoming a Scientific Advisor. In 1992, he joined the Budapest University of Technology and Economics as a Scientific Advisor and later became a Professor of Physics. He also held positions as Deputy Director and Director of the Institute of Physics at the university, and was the Head of the Department of Theoretical Physics from 1995 to 2007.

From 2012, Kertész has been a professor at CEU and became the Head of the Department of Network and Data Science in 2018. His research interests span across statistical physics and its applications in various fields, including percolation theory, phase transitions, fractal growth, granular materials, and simulation methods. Over the past 25 years, his focus has shifted to multidisciplinary topics, especially complex networks and financial analysis and modeling.

Kertész has published over 280 scientific papers and has been a visiting scientist in numerous countries including Germany, the US, France, Italy, and Finland.

Kertész received several fellowships and had numerous academic appointments abroad. These include a DAAD-Stipendium at Cologne University, A.v.Humboldt-Fellowship, and visiting roles in various prestigious institutions across Europe and the United States.

He has been actively involved in the scientific community, serving as a secretary and chairman of various committees in the Hungarian Physical Society and the Hungarian Academy of Sciences. Kertész has also organized and co-organized several international conferences and workshops, and has been a member of the editorial and advisory boards of multiple scientific journals. He was elected chair of IUPAP Commission on Statistical Physics (C3) in October 2024 for the period 2025–2027.

Kertész's work has been recognized with several awards and honors, including the Young Scientist Prize of the Hungarian Academy of Sciences, the Novobátzky Award, the Academy Award, the Arnold Ipolyi Award, the "Finland Distinguished Professor" title, the Santa Chiara Prize, the Albert Szent-Gyorgyi Award, and the prestigious Szechenyi Award from the President of Hungary.
