= Frances Woolley =

Canadian economist

Academic background
- Education: Simon Fraser University (B.A.); Queen's University (M.A.); London School of Economics (Ph.D.)

Academic work
- Discipline: Labor economics Public Finance
- Website: https://carleton.ca/fwoolley/

Frances Woolley is a professor of economics at Carleton University, Canada, and has been teaching there since 1990. She holds a B.A. from Simon Fraser University, a M.A. from Queen's University, and a Ph.D. from London School of Economics under the supervision of Tony Atkinson. Her thesis was titled Economic models of family decision-making, with applications to intergenerational justice. Her research includes fields such as public finance, labour economics, as well as family and public policies. She has served as secretary treasurer and president of the Canadian Economics Association and co-editor of Review of Economics of the Household, on the editorial boards of Feminist Economics and the Journal of Socio-Economics, and as the associate dean of the Faculty of Public Affairs at Carleton University.

In recent years, she has been devoting more time to writing on her blog, Worthwhile Canadian Initiative, and to writing for The Globe and Mail. In describing herself, she says, "I theorize about life" and uses economics to relate to things that happen in everyday life.

== Education ==
Woolley received a B.A. (Hon) from Simon Fraser University in British Columbia in 1985. She received a M.A. in economics from Queen's University in Ontario in 1986, and went on to pursue her Ph.D. in economics in London School of Economics (LSE), where she graduated in 1990. At LSE, her thesis was Economic Models of Family Decision Making, with Applications to Intergenerational Justice.

== Career ==
=== Teaching ===
Woolley started as a visiting lecturer in the department of economics at University of British Columbia from 1989 to 1990. In 1997, she worked as a visiting assistant professor in the department of economics at Simon Fraser University. From 1990 to 1998, she worked in Carleton University as assistant professor, where she later became associate professor from 1998 to 2003 and professor starting 2003. From 2013 to 2016, she also served as the associate dean of curriculum and planning at faculty of public affairs at Carleton University.

=== Editorial ===
In 2007, Woolley served as the member on the editorial board of Journal of Socio-Economics. From 1999 to 2004 and from 2007 onward, she has been on the editorial board of Feminist Economics, where she also served as the book reviews editor and associate editor from 2004 to 2005 and associate editor from 2005 to 2007. From 2005 to 2008, she was the associate editor of Review of Economics of the Household, where she holds the position of co-editor from 2009 to 2012. From 2007 to 2011, Woolley was also the business editor of Canadian Public Policy.

== Selected work ==
Woolley's research interests and expertise include but not limited to economics of the family, gender and intra-household inequality, taxation/benefits of/for families, interdisciplinarity and feminist economics.

== Professional honours and highlighted work ==
=== Professional honours ===
- 2017-2018: President, Canadian Economics Association
- 2001: Doug Purvis Memorial Prize
  “Taxing Canadian Families: What’s Fair, What’s Not” Choices vol 6(5) July 2000 with Carole Vincen
- 1997: John Vanderkamp Prize for best article published in Canadian Public Policy

=== Highlighted work ===
==== “A Cournot-Nash Model of Family Decision Making” (with Zhiqi Chen), Economic Journal, Vol. 111, No. 474 (October 2001), pp. 722–748. ====
On Google Scholar, this paper is the most cited (336 times) article by Woolley with Zhiqi Chen. The paper simulates a two-person family in which individuals are utility-maximizing yet interdependent due to social and economic causes. The Cournot-Nash game is used in the paper to first reach the equilibrium as an approach to solve the utility-maximizing problem, and then used as a "threat point in a bargaining game". Overall, the paper examines the issues within the households related to resource allocation, bargaining power, as well as under the influence of public policy.

==== “Ending Universality: The Case of Child Benefits” Canadian Public Policy, 22(1): 24-39, 1996. (with A. Vermaeten and J. Madill. Principal author, Frances Woolley; secondary author, Judith Madill; research assistance, Arndt Vermaeten.) ====
Woolley won the John Vanderkamp Price for best article published in Canadian Public Policy in 1997 with this article, where she was the principal author with Judith Madill being the secondary author and Arndt Vermaeten being the research assistant. The paper explores the effect of 1993 child tax benefit as well as the tax and benefit system, evaluating who are the beneficiaries of the benefits. The paper argues that the greatest net beneficiaries of were lower-middle income families instead of the poorest family due to the tax system. It also argues that earned income supplement would in general lead to an increase in marginal tax rate in Canada due to tax back provision.

==== “Taxing Canadian Families: What’s Fair, What’s Not” Choices vol 6(5) July 2000 with Carole Vincent ====
Woolley won the Outstanding Research Contribution Award, Canadian Policy Research Awards in 2000 as well as the Doug Purvis Memorial Prize due to her work that she created with Carole Vincent. The book looks at household economics and provides analysis on family taxation issues. In particular, the book explores issues including taxation on families taking into account of child care, lower-income families, as well as family arrangement. The book proposes some policy solutions with the intention to solve the problems around these issues mentioned above in the Canadian system.
