= Journal of Behavioral and Experimental Economics =

- Discipline: Behavioral economics, socio-economics, experimental economics
- Language: English
- Edited by: Pablo Branas-Garza

Publication details
- Former names: Journal of Behavioral Economics, Journal of Socio-Economics
- History: 1972-present
- Publisher: Elsevier
- Frequency: Bimonthly
- Impact factor: 1.831 (2021)

Standard abbreviations
- ISO 4: J. Behav. Exp. Econ.

Indexing
- ISSN: 2214-8043

Links
- Journal homepage; Online access

The Journal of Behavioral and Experimental Economics is a bimonthly peer-reviewed academic journal covering behavioral and experimental economics. It was established in 1972 as the Journal of Behavioral Economics, and was renamed the Journal of Socio-Economics in 1991. It obtained its current name in 2014. The editor-in-chief is Pablo Branas-Garza. In 2013-2021 its editor was Ofer Azar (Ben-Gurion University of the Negev). According to the Journal Citation Reports, the journal has a 2021 impact factor of 1.831.
