= Orrell =

Orrell may refer to:

- Orrell, Greater Manchester, a district of the Metropolitan Borough of Wigan
  - Orrell (ward), an electoral ward of the Wigan Metropolitan Borough Council
- Orrell, Merseyside, an urban area east of Bootle, in the Metropolitan Borough of Sefton
- Orrell Urban District, Lancashire
- Orrell R.U.F.C., a rugby union team from Wigan
- Orrell (surname)
