= Apollo's Arrow =

2007 book about prediction by David Orrell

Apollo’s Arrow: The Science of Prediction and the Future of Everything
- Hardcover edition
- Author: David Orrell
- Language: English
- Subject: Prediction
- Genre: Non-fiction
- Publisher: HarperCollins
- Publication date: 2007
- Publication place: Canada
- Media type: Print
- Pages: 464 pp.
- ISBN: 978-0002007405
- OCLC: 141383993
- Dewey Decimal: 003.2
- LC Class: CB158 .O69 2007

Apollo’s Arrow: The Science of Prediction and the Future of Everything is a non-fiction book about prediction written by Canadian author and mathematician David Orrell. The book was initially published in Canada by HarperCollins in 2007, and was a national bestseller. It was published in the United States as The Future of Everything: The Science of Prediction, and translated versions were also published in Japan, South Korea and China.

The book was taught as part of a university course in “Forecasting via Mathematical Modeling” at Gustavus Adolphus College in 2009.

== Summary ==
In this book, Orrell explains the science of prediction to a general audience. The book begins with a general history of prediction from the Delphic oracle to the present day. The next part considers three different areas of prediction in detail: weather, health and economics. It argues that these are all examples of complex systems that cannot be reduced to equations. As mathematical models become more refined, the number of unknown parameters tends to explode. At the same time, networks of interlocking feedback loops make the models unstable. According to Orrell, the resulting model error (rather than e.g. the butterfly effect) is the main reason why forecasts go wrong.

In the final part, the book turns to predictions for the future, including the long-term effects of climate change. It concludes with some thoughts for the future, as well as a reminder that all such forecasts are unreliable.

The title of the book is a reference to a mythical arrow that once belonged to the god Apollo. According to legend, the arrow was gifted by a priest to Pythagoras, allowing him to dart through space and time.
