= Tomáš Sedláček (economist) =

Czech philosopher of economics (born 1977)

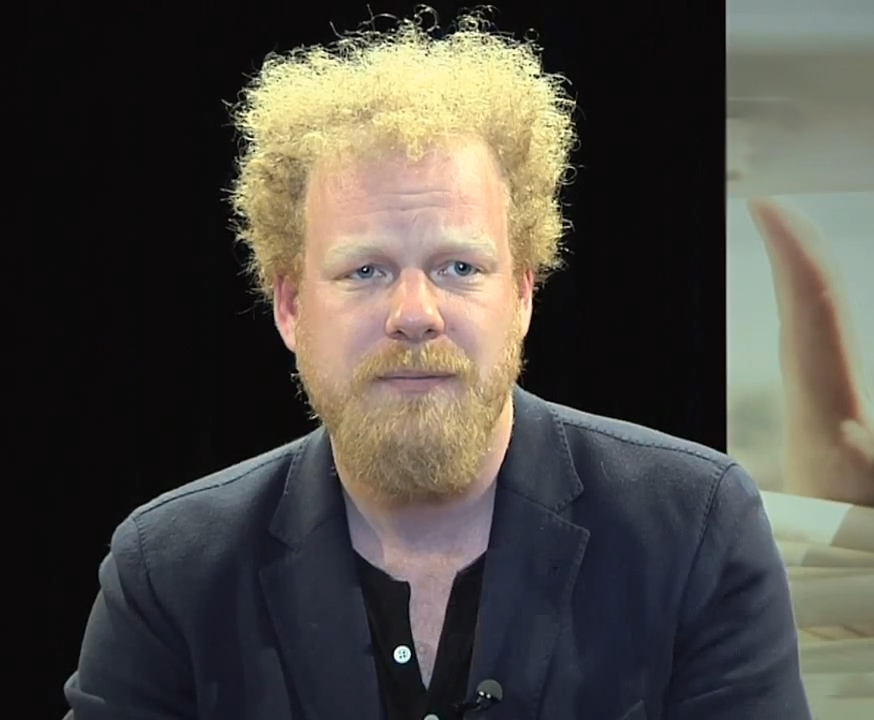
- Sedláček in 2013
- Born: 23 January 1977 (age 49); Prague, Czechoslovakia
- Occupations: economist; philosopher; teacher; writer
- Spouses: Markéta Sedláčková (m. 2000–2020) Tanja Schug (m. 2022)
- Children: 2

Academic background
- Education: Charles University in Prague
- Website: http://www.tomassedlacek.cz/en/home

Tomas Sedlacek (born 23 January 1977) is a Czech economist, philosopher, educator, and writer who gained widespread international recognition for his book on philosophy and economy, "Economics of Good and Evil" (Oxford University Press), which has been translated into 22 languages. Since March 2025, he has been the Director of the Václav Havel Library. Sedlacek has advised former Czech President Václav Havel and has lectured at the World Economic Forum and around the world. For 16 years, he was a Chief Macroeconomic Strategist at the largest Czech bank, and has been a longstanding member of the Czech National Economic Council. Tomáš Sedláček is also the author of the English-language podcast CzechMate.

== Biography and career ==
Tomas Sedlacek gained international fame for his award-winning, bestselling book Economics of Good and Evil: The Quest for Economic Meaning from Gilgamesh to Wall Street (Oxford University Press, 2011) which was translated into 22 languages and received the prestigious German “Wirtschaftsbuchpreis” at Frankfurt Book Fair for its original philosophical contribution to economics. In Switzerland, he was listed among the top 100 influential global thinkers (Top 100 Thought Leaders, GDI).

Born in 1977 in Prague, Czechoslovakia, Sedlacek grew up in Helsinki, Finland, and was educated in Copenhagen, Denmark. At the age of 24, Sedlacek became an economic advisor of Czech president Václav Havel until the end of his term in office. He went back to academia and has written case studies with Harvard University and Georgetown University. Later, he served as a non-political economic advisor to the Minister of Finance and deputy Prime Minister of the Czech Republic, responsible for fiscal reform, pensions and health care reform and a number of tax reforms (VAT, personal income tax and corporate tax). He was responsible for negotiations with The World Bank and OECD. He toured the world on a roadshow for the inaugural Czech Eurobond emission. Afterwards, he received a fellowship at Yale University as a Yale World Fellow 2006, during this time Yale Economic Review ranked him among the Five Hot Young Guns in Economics. For sixteen years, he worked as a Chief Macroeconomic Strategist at a major Czech bank, CSOB. Later, he became a founding and long term member of the National Economic Council, an advisory body to the Government of Czech Republic (NERV).

Tomas Sedlacek was a member of the Program Council for New Economic Thinking of World Economic Forum that meets in Davos and a member of an advisory body to EC president Barroso on New Narrative for Europe. He lectured at Charles University, Anglo-American University, University of New York Prague and currently lectures at Metropolitan University Prague. He sits on boards of many non-profit organizations, Archa Theatre and Vize 97. For sixteen years, he has been publishing weekly columns in major economic newspapers, which then got published in a book trilogy Second Derivative of Desire.

Currently, he is working on three new books:

- The Spirit of Economics and The New Republic of the Internet
- Job of God—God's Job
- Spirit of Europe

A respected media commentator and a business speaker (London Speakers Bureau), he travels internationally to engage in critical discussions on contemporary economic issues, integrating insights from mythology, philosophy, and an array of related disciplines.

Tomáš Sedláček was widowed from sociologist and educator Markéta Sedláčková (†2020) with whom he has a son, Kryštof (*2007). In 2020, he married Tanja Schug who gave birth to their daughter, Europa Markéta.

== Podcast CzechMate ==
Tomáš Sedláček is also the author of the English-language podcast CzechMate. In CzechMate he deals with everything from philosophical questions about existence to Star Wars tales. The podcast began broadcasting in January 2020 and currently has thousands of listeners in the Czech Republic, Slovakia, the United States, Germany, Japan and other countries.

Available on Spotify, Apple Podcasts, Google Podcasts, Radio public and more platforms. CzechMate begins its 3rd season in January 2023.

Podcast production and graphic design by Tereza Šlápotová.

== Economics of Good and Evil ==
The book Ekonomie dobra a zla: po stopách lidského tázání od Gilgameše po finanční krizi (published in English under the title Economics of Good and Evil: The Quest for Economic Meaning from Gilgamesh to Wall Street) is a modified version of Sedláček's thesis submitted – but rejected due to "questionable scientific value" – at the Faculty of Social Sciences of the Charles University in Prague. The book became a bestseller in the Czech Republic.

In his book, Sedláček refuses the one-sided view of economics as a value-free mathematical inquiry. He describes economics as a cultural phenomenon and a product of our civilization closely tied with philosophy, myth, religion, anthropology, and the arts. According to Sedláček, economics should not concern only abstract mathematical modeling but also societies' values.

The broad concept of the book covers the history of economics through the millennia, "from the epic of Gilgamesh and the Old Testament to the emergence of Christianity, from Descartes and Adam Smith to Fight Club and The Matrix."

Additionally, the book explores some of the fundamental and provocative questions of the present time: "Is growth the only answer? Are we addicted to desire? Does it pay to be good?"

In 2009, the book received the Wald Press Award. In 2012, the book won the "Deutscher Wirtschaftsbuchpreis" (2012 Frankfurt Book Fair Award) for the best economic title in Germany. The work was praised by the economics professor Deirdre McCloskey.

== Publications ==
- Druhá derivace touhy III: Pravdoláskaři a Bohémové - Sedláček, T., I Praha, 65. pole, 2021. 436 pg. ISBN 978-80-88268-53-6
- Druhá derivace touhy II: Na prahu digitální teologie - Sedláček, T., I Praha, 65. pole, 2020. 336 pg. ISBN 978-80-88268-32-1
- Druhá derivace touhy I: Člověk duše‑vnější - Sedláček, T., I Praha, 65. pole, 2016. 384 pg. ISBN 978-80-88268-12-3
- 2036 – Jak budeme žít za 20 let? - Sedláček, T., I Praha, 65. pole, 2013. 236 pg. ISBN 978-80-87506-81-3
- Lilith und die Dämonen des Kapitals: Die Ökonomie auf Freuds Couch - Sedláček, T., Tanzer, O.I Mnichov, Carl Hanser Verlag GmbH & Co. KG, 2015. 350 pg. ISBN 9783446444577
- (R)evoluční ekonomie: O systému a lidech - Sedláček, T., Graeber, D. a Chlupatý, R. I Praha, 65. pole, 2013. 136 pg. ISBN 978-80-87506-28-8
- Soumrak homo economicus - Sedláček, T., Orrell, D. a Chlupatý, R. I Praha, 65. pole, 2012. 80 pg. ISBN 978-80-87506-07-3
- Ekonomie dobra a zla: Po stopách lidského tázání od Gilgameše po finanční krizi. - Sedláček, T., I Praha, 65. pole, 2009. 272 pg. ISBN 978-80-903944-3-8

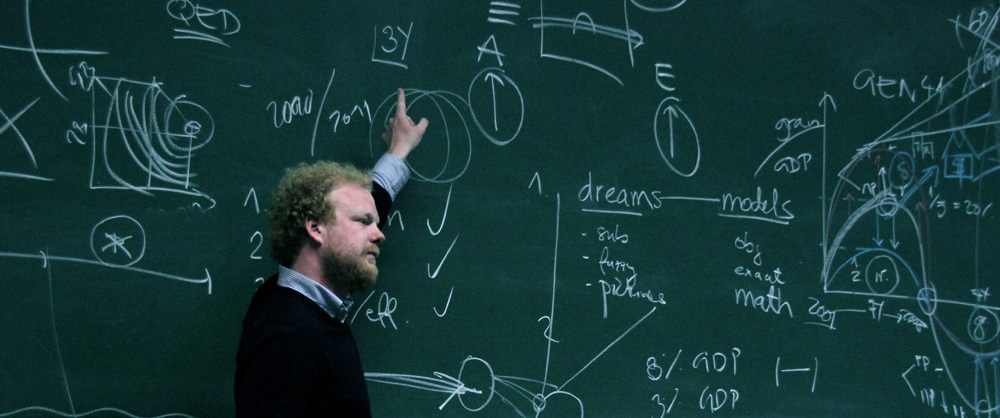
Tomáš Sedláček 2012

== Lectures ==
- 2023 - BlueOrchard Impact Talks: Tomas Sedláček, Philosopher of Economics and Author
- 2022 - Recite Al Jazeeri: Tomáš Sedláček
- 2022 - Válka na Ukrajině a její dopady na svět - Aleš Karmazin, Michael Romancov, Tomáš Sedláček
- 2018 - Tomáš Sedláček: Ekonomika se nachází ve stavu maniodeprese
- 2014 - Tomáš Sedláček erklärt die kulturellen Wurzeln unserer Gier | Sternstunde Philosophie | SRF Kultur
- 2013 - LSFF: Ekonomie mezi vědou a vírou - Tomaš Sedláček
- 2012 - Tomas Sedlacek: Human being virtually - desire for good and evil or Internet philosophically
- 2011 - Young Guns | Tomas Sedlacek | Talks at Google
- 2011 - The Economics of Good and Evil
