= John Orrell =

British author and theatre historian

John Orrell (31 December 1934 – 16 September 2003) was a British author, theatre historian, and English professor at the University of Alberta. The New York Times described him as the "historian whose intellectual detective work laid the groundwork for the 1997 re-creation of Shakespeare’s original Globe Theater."

== Life and work ==
Orrell was born in Kent, England. After completing his National Service as a pilot at the NATO base in Moose Jaw, Saskatchewan, he obtained a degree in English at University College, Oxford, followed by a Ph.D. at the University of Toronto. In 1961 he joined the English department at the University of Alberta in Edmonton, where he lived for the rest of his life.

Orrell wrote and presented documentaries for CBC Television on a wide range of subjects, from Louis Riel to avalanche control to the Renaissance and Elizabethan culture. His first book was Fallen Empires: Lost Theatres of Edmonton 1881–1914 (1981), and his research for this project led to his studies of playhouses of the Tudor age. His book The Quest for Shakespeare’s Globe, published by Cambridge University Press in 1983, brought him international recognition, and led to his serving as advisor to the architect for Sam Wanamaker’s reconstruction of Shakespeare's Globe theatre in Southwark, London.

John Orrell died in Edmonton on 16 September 2003 from skin cancer. In June 2004, he was posthumously given the Sam Wanamaker Award at the Globe in London. In October 2004, during Edmonton’s centennial celebration, he was named one of the 100 Edmontonians of the century.

His son is the mathematician and author David Orrell.

== Books by John Orrell ==
- Fallen Empires: Lost Theatres of Edmonton 1881–1914 (1981)
- The Quest for Shakespeare’s Globe (1983)
- The Theatres of Inigo Jones and John Webb (1985)
- The Human Stage: English Theatre Design 1567–1840 (1988)
- Rebuilding Shakespeare’s Globe (1989), written with Andrew Gurr

== Awards ==
- 2004 Sam Wanamaker Prize
- 100 Edmontonians of the Century
