= Richard Orrell =

English footballer

Richard 'Dicky' Orrell
Personal information
- Full name: Richard Orrell
- Date of birth: 4 November 1875
- Place of birth: Farington, England
- Date of death: 6 June 1919 (aged 43)
- Place of death: Preston, England
- Position: Full back

Senior career*
Years	Team	Apps	(Gls)
1899–1906	Preston North End	140	(0)
1906–1907	Plymouth Argyle	43	(0)
1907–1909	Southport Central	77	(0)
1909–1911	Great Harwood		
1911	Higher Walton Albion		
1911	Great Harwood		
Total		260	(0)
- * Club domestic league appearances and goals

Richard 'Dicky' Orrell (4 November 1875 – 6 June 1919) was an English footballer who played in the Football League for Preston North End.

He served during the First World War as Private R.Orrell with the Royal Army Medical Corps, 2nd Training Battalion, Service No: 128715. He is buried a Commonwealth War Grave at All Saints Churchyard, Higher Walton, South Ribble Borough, Lancashire, England.
