= Andrei Khrennikov =

Russian mathematical physicist

- Born: 1958; Volgograd
- Education: Moscow State University
- Scientific career
- Fields: quantum foundations; quantum-like modeling; foundations of probability; p-adic mathematical physics, dynamical systems; cognitive modelling; decision making; psychology; mathematical modeling in genetics
- Workplaces: Moscow University for Electronic Engineering; Bochum University; Linnaeus University
- Doctoral advisor: Oleg Georgievich Smolyanov
- Website: lnu.se/en/staff/andrei.khrennikov

Andrei Khrennikov (born 1958) is a Russian-Swedish mathematical physicist. He is a professor of applied mathematics at the Linnaeus University in Växjö, Sweden. At Linnaeus University, he is the director of International Center for Mathematical Modeling and organizer for more than 25 years of one of the few international conference series dedicated to foundations of quantum mechanics.

He obtained a PhD in mathematical physics from the Moscow State University in 1983.

== Research ==
His research is multidisciplinary and he authored 22 books and around 500 articles. He is one of active developers of quantum-like modelling, applications of the methodology and formalism of quantum theory to cognition, psychology, decision making, social and political sciences, economics and finance, genetics and molecular biology.

== Awards ==
The best researcher prize of Linnaeus University, 2017. Fetzer Pioneers Award In recognition of the pioneering works of Prof. Khrennikov in quantum foundations and applications of quantum theory outside of physics, 2018. 1.
