= List of things named after Jacques Hadamard =

These are things named after Jacques Hadamard (1865–1963), a French mathematician. (For references, see the respective articles.)

== Complex analysis ==
- Cauchy–Hadamard theorem – a statement in complex analysis describing the radius of convergence of a power series
- Hadamard factorization theorem – concerning the factorization of entire functions of finite order
  - The Hadamard product formula for the Riemann zeta function
- Hadamard gap theorem – concerning the analytic continuation of complex power series
- Hadamard three-circle theorem – concerning the maxima of holomorphic functions within concentric circles in the complex plane
- Hadamard three-lines theorem – concerning the maxima of holomorphic functions defined in vertical strips of the complex plane
- Hadamard's lemma – a result closely related to the first-order term in Taylor's theorem
- Hadamard regularization
- Hadamard's gamma function
- Hadamard multiplication theorem – for the singularities of coefficient-wise product of power series
- Hadamard's theorem on the radius of meromorphy – for the formula for the m-th radius of meromorphy

== Matrix theory ==
- Hadamard matrix – a square matrix whose entries are either +1 or −1 and whose rows are mutually orthogonal
  - Regular Hadamard matrix
  - Hadamard conjecture
  - Complex Hadamard matrix
  - Butson-type Hadamard matrix
- Hadamard code – a system used for signal error detection and correction based on Hadamard matrices
- Hadamard's inequality – a bound on the determinant of a matrix whose entries are complex numbers in terms of the lengths of its column vectors
- Hadamard's maximal determinant problem
- Hadamard product – for entry-wise matrix multiplication

== Differential geometry ==
- Hadamard space – a geodesically complete metric space of non-positive curvature
- Cartan–Hadamard theorem – a statement in Riemannian geometry concerning the structure of complete Riemannian manifolds of non-positive sectional curvature.
- Cartan–Hadamard conjecture – an open problem in Riemannian geometry and geometric measure theory concerning the generalization of the classical isoperimetric inequality to spaces of nonpositive sectional curvature
- Hadamard manifold
- Hadamard's embedding theorem

== Differential equations and dynamical systems ==
- Hadamard's method of descent – a method of solving partial differential equations by reducing dimensions
- Hadamard parametrix construction – a method of solving second order partial differential equations
- Hadamard's dynamical system – a type of chaotic dynamical system
- Hadamard–Rybczynski equation
- Hadamard variation formula

== Cryptography and quantum computing ==
- Hadamard gate – a standard quantum gate that generalizes a coin flip
- Hadamard test
- Hadamard transform – an example of a generalized class of Fourier transforms
  - Fast Walsh–Hadamard transform – an efficient algorithm to compute the Hadamard transform
  - Pseudo-Hadamard transform

== Real analysis ==
- Hermite–Hadamard inequality – a bound on the mean value of a convex function in an interval in terms of the value it takes at the mid-point and ends of interval
- Hadamard fractional integral

== Probability and statistics ==
- Hadamard derivative
- Hadamard variance
