= Walsh matrix =

Orthogonal matrix

Hadamard matrix of order 16 multiplied with a vector

Naturally ordered Hadamard matrix permuted into sequency-ordered Walsh matrix. The number of sign changes per row in the naturally ordered matrix is (0, 15, 7, 8, 3, 12, 4, 11, 1, 14, 6, 9, 2, 13, 5, 10), in the sequency-ordered matrix the number of sign changes is consecutive.

LDU decomposition of a Hadamard matrix. The ones in the triangular matrices form Sierpinski triangles. The entries of the diagonal matrix are values from Gould's sequence, with the minus signs distributed like the ones in Thue–Morse sequence.

In mathematics, a Walsh matrix is a specific square matrix of dimensions 2^{n}, where n is some particular natural number. The entries of the matrix are either +1 or −1 and its rows as well as columns are orthogonal. The Walsh matrix was proposed by Joseph L. Walsh in 1923. Each row of a Walsh matrix corresponds to a Walsh function.

The Walsh matrices are a special case of Hadamard matrices where the rows are rearranged so that the number of sign changes in a row is in increasing order. In short, a Hadamard matrix is defined by the recursive formula below and is naturally ordered, whereas a Walsh matrix is sequency-ordered. Confusingly, different sources refer to either matrix as the Walsh matrix.

The Walsh matrix (and Walsh functions) are used in computing the Walsh transform and have applications in the efficient implementation of certain signal processing operations.

== Formula ==
The Hadamard matrices of dimension $2^k$ for $k \in \mathbb{N}$ are given by the recursive formula (the lowest order of Hadamard matrix is 2):

$$\begin{align}
H\left(2^1\right) &= \begin{bmatrix}
1 &  1 \\
1 & -1
\end{bmatrix}, \\
H\left(2^2\right) &= \begin{bmatrix}
1 &  1 &  1 &  1 \\
1 & -1 &  1 & -1 \\
1 &  1 & -1 & -1 \\
1 & -1 & -1 &  1 \\
\end{bmatrix},
\end{align}$$

and in general

$$H\left(2^k\right) = \begin{bmatrix}
H\left(2^{k-1}\right) &  H\left(2^{k-1}\right) \\
H\left(2^{k-1}\right) & -H\left(2^{k-1}\right)
\end{bmatrix} =
H(2) \otimes H\left(2^{k-1}\right),$$

for 2 ≤ k ∈ N, where ⊗ denotes the Kronecker product.

=== Permutation ===
We can obtain a Walsh matrix from a Hadamard matrix. For that, we first generate the Hadamard matrix for a given dimension. Then, we count the number of sign changes of each row. Finally, we re-order the rows of the matrix according to the number of sign changes in ascending order.

For example, let us assume that we have a Hadamard matrix of dimension $2^2$

$$H(4) = \begin{bmatrix}
1 &  1 &  1 &  1 \\
1 & -1 &  1 & -1 \\
1 &  1 & -1 & -1 \\
1 & -1 & -1 &  1 \\
\end{bmatrix}$$,

where the successive rows have 0, 3, 1, and 2 sign changes (we count the number of times we switch from a positive 1 to a negative 1, and vice versa). If we rearrange the rows in sequency ordering, we obtain:

$$W(4) = \begin{bmatrix}
1 &  1 &  1 &  1 \\
1 &  1 & -1 & -1 \\
1 & -1 & -1 &  1 \\
1 & -1 &  1 & -1 \\
\end{bmatrix},$$

where the successive rows have 0, 1, 2, and 3 sign changes.

=== Alternative forms of the Walsh matrix ===
==== Sequency ordering ====
The sequency ordering of the rows of the Walsh matrix can be derived from the ordering of the Hadamard matrix by first applying the bit-reversal permutation and then the Gray-code permutation:

$$W(8) = \begin{bmatrix}
1 &  1 &  1 &  1 &  1 &  1 &  1 &  1 \\
1 &  1 &  1 &  1 & -1 & -1 & -1 & -1 \\
1 &  1 & -1 & -1 & -1 & -1 &  1 &  1 \\
1 &  1 & -1 & -1 &  1 &  1 & -1 & -1 \\
1 & -1 & -1 &  1 &  1 & -1 & -1 &  1 \\
1 & -1 & -1 &  1 & -1 &  1 &  1 & -1 \\
1 & -1 &  1 & -1 & -1 &  1 & -1 &  1 \\
1 & -1 &  1 & -1 &  1 & -1 &  1 & -1 \\
\end{bmatrix},$$

where the successive rows have 0, 1, 2, 3, 4, 5, 6, and 7 sign changes.

==== Dyadic ordering ====
$$W(8) = \begin{bmatrix}
1 &  1 &  1 &  1 &  1 &  1 &  1 &  1 \\
1 &  1 &  1 &  1 & -1 & -1 & -1 & -1 \\
1 &  1 & -1 & -1 &  1 &  1 & -1 & -1 \\
1 &  1 & -1 & -1 & -1 & -1 &  1 &  1 \\
1 & -1 &  1 & -1 &  1 & -1 &  1 & -1 \\
1 & -1 &  1 & -1 & -1 &  1 & -1 &  1 \\
1 & -1 & -1 &  1 &  1 & -1 & -1 &  1 \\
1 & -1 & -1 &  1 & -1 &  1 &  1 & -1 \\
\end{bmatrix},$$

where the successive rows have 0, 1, 3, 2, 7, 6, 4, and 5 sign changes.

==== Natural ordering ====
$$H (8) = \begin{bmatrix}
1 &  1 &  1 &  1 &  1 &  1 &  1 &  1 \\
1 & -1 &  1 & -1 &  1 & -1 &  1 & -1 \\
1 &  1 & -1 & -1 &  1 &  1 & -1 & -1 \\
1 & -1 & -1 &  1 &  1 & -1 & -1 &  1 \\
1 &  1 &  1 &  1 & -1 & -1 & -1 & -1 \\
1 & -1 &  1 & -1 & -1 &  1 & -1 &  1 \\
1 &  1 & -1 & -1 & -1 & -1 &  1 &  1 \\
1 & -1 & -1 &  1 & -1 &  1 &  1 & -1 \\
\end{bmatrix},$$

where the successive rows have 0, 7, 3, 4, 1, 6, 2, and 5 sign changes (Hadamard matrix).

== See also ==
- Haar wavelet
- Quincunx matrix
- Hadamard transform
- Code-division multiple access
- OEIS: A228539 (OEIS: A228540) – rows of the (negated) binary Walsh matrices read as reverse binary numbers
- OEIS: A197818 – antidiagonals of the negated binary Walsh matrix read as binary numbers
