= Williamson conjecture =

In combinatorial mathematics, specifically in combinatorial design theory and combinatorial matrix theory, the Williamson conjecture is that Williamson matrices of order $n$ exist for all positive integers $n$. Four symmetric and circulant matrices $A$, $B$, $C$, $D$ are called Williamson matrices if their entries are $\pm1$ and they satisfy the relationship

$$A^2 + B^2 + C^2 + D^2 = 4n\, I$$

where $I$ is the identity matrix of order $n$. John Williamson showed that if $A$, $B$, $C$, $D$ are Williamson matrices then

$$\begin{bmatrix}
A &  B &  C &  D \\
-B &  A & -D &  C \\
-C &  D &  A & -B \\
-D & -C &  B &  A
\end{bmatrix}$$

is an Hadamard matrix of order $4n$. It was once considered likely that Williamson matrices exist for all orders $n$ and that the structure of Williamson matrices could provide a route to proving the Hadamard conjecture that Hadamard matrices exist for all orders $4n$. However, in 1993 the Williamson conjecture was shown to be false by Dragomir Ž. Ðoković through an exhaustive computer search, which demonstrated that Williamson matrices do not exist of order $n=35$. In 2008, the counterexamples 47, 53, and 59 were additionally discovered.

Following the negative result of Ðoković, which ruled out the existence of Williamson matrices of order $n=35$, it was shown in 2019 that relaxing the symmetry and circulant requirements nevertheless permits a Hadamard matrix of this block form to exist for that order. One such instance is given by the sequences

a = --+--+--+++-+----+-+++--+--+-------
b = +---+---+-++-+--+-++-+---+---++++++
c = -++---+-+--+--++--+++++-+-+++++-+--
d = +----+++-+-+--++--+-+-+++----++---+

with the associated matrices defined by

A = circulant(a)
B = circulant(b)
C = fliplr(circulant(c))
D = circulant(d)
