= John Williamson (mathematician) =

Scottish mathematician (1901–1949)

- Born: 23 May 1901; Kinross, Scotland
- Died: 1949; Baltimore, Maryland, US
- Education: University of Edinburgh, University of Chicago
- Known for: Williamson construction of Hadamard matrices
- Scientific career
- Fields: Mathematics

John Williamson (23 May 1901 – 1949) was a Scottish mathematician who worked in the fields of algebra, invariant theory, and linear algebra. Among other contributions, he is known for the Williamson construction of Hadamard matrices. Williamson graduated from the University of Edinburgh with first-class honours in 1922. Awarded a newly established Commonwealth Fund Fellowship in 1925, he studied at the University of Chicago under the direction of L. E. Dickson and E. H. Moore, receiving the Ph.D. in 1927. He held a Lectureship in Mathematics at the University of St Andrews and an Associate Professorship in Mathematics at Johns Hopkins University.

== See also ==
- Williamson conjecture
