= Balanced repeated replication =

Statistical technique for estimating sampling variability

Balanced repeated replication (BRR) is a statistical technique for estimating the sampling variability of a statistic obtained by stratified sampling.

== Outline of the technique ==
1. Select balanced half-samples from the full sample.
2. Calculate the statistic of interest for each half-sample.
3. Estimate the variance of the statistic on the basis of differences between the full-sample and half-sample values.

== Selection of half-samples ==
=== Simplified version ===
Consider first an idealized situation, where each stratum of our sample contains only two units. Then each half-sample will contain exactly one of these, so that the half-samples share the stratification of the full sample. If there are s strata, we would ideally take all 2^{s} ways of choosing the half-stratum; but if s is large, this may be infeasible.

If fewer half-samples must be taken, they are selected so as to be "balanced" (hence the name of the technique). Let H be a Hadamard matrix of size s, and choose one row per half-sample. (It doesn't matter which rows; the important fact is that all the rows of H are orthogonal.) Now, for each half-sample, choose which unit to take from each stratum according to the sign of the corresponding entry in H: that is, for half-sample h, we choose the first unit from stratum k if H_{hk} = −1 and the second unit if H_{hk} = +1. The orthogonality of rows of H ensures that our choices are uncorrelated between half-samples.

=== Realistic version ===
Unfortunately, there may not be a Hadamard matrix of size s. In this case, we choose one of size slightly larger than s. Now the submatrix of H which defines our choices need no longer have exactly orthogonal rows, but if the size of H is only slightly larger than s the rows will be approximately orthogonal.

The number of units per stratum need not be exactly 2, and typically will not be. In this case, the units in each stratum are divided into two "variance PSUs" (PSU = primary sampling unit) of equal or nearly-equal size. This may be done at random, or in such a way as to make the PSUs as similar as possible. (So, for instance, if stratification was done on the basis of some numerical parameter, the units in each stratum may be sorted in order of this parameter, and alternate ones chosen for the two PSUs.)

If the number of strata is very large, multiple strata may be combined before applying BRR. The resulting groups are known as "variance strata".

== BRR formula ==
Let a be the value of our statistic as calculated from the full sample; let a_{i} (i = 1,...,n) be the corresponding statistics calculated for the half-samples. (n is the number of half-samples.)

Then our estimate for the sampling variance of the statistic is the average of (a_{i} − a)^{2}. This is (at least in the ideal case) an unbiased estimate of the sampling variance.

== Fay's method ==
Fay's method is a generalization of BRR. Instead of simply taking half-size samples, we use the full sample every time but with unequal weighting: k for units outside the half-sample and 2 − k for units inside it. (BRR is the case k = 0.) The variance estimate is then V/(1 − k)^{2}, where V is the estimate given by the BRR formula above.

== See also ==
- Resampling (statistics)
