= Hermite–Hadamard inequality =

In mathematics, the Hermite–Hadamard inequality, named after Charles Hermite and Jacques Hadamard and sometimes also called Hadamard's inequality, states that if a function f : [a, b] → R is convex, then the following chain of inequalities hold:

$$f\left( \frac{a+b}{2}\right) \le \frac{1}{b - a}\int_a^b f(x)\,dx \le \frac{f(a) + f(b)}{2}.$$

The inequality has been generalized to higher dimensions: if $\Omega \subset \mathbb{R}^n$ is a bounded, convex domain and $f:\Omega \rightarrow \mathbb{R}$ is a positive convex function, then

$$\frac{1}{|\Omega|} \int_\Omega f(x) \, dx \leq \frac{c_n}{|\partial \Omega|} \int_{\partial \Omega} f(y) \, d\sigma(y)$$

where $c_n$ is a constant depending only on the dimension. The best known bound on $c_n$ is $c_n \leq 2n^{3/2}$ and $c_n \geq n-1$.
