= Jacket matrix =

Square matrix that is a generalization of the Hadamard matrix

In mathematics, a jacket matrix is a square symmetric matrix $A= (a_{ij})$ of order n if its entries are non-zero and real, complex, or from a finite field, and

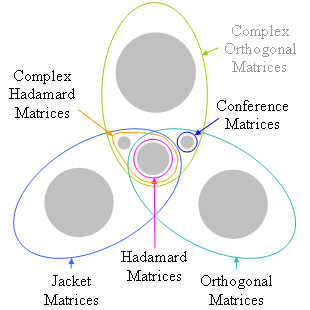
Hierarchy of matrix types

$$\  AB=BA=I_n$$

where I_{n} is the identity matrix, and

$$\ B ={1 \over n}(a_{ij}^{-1})^T.$$

where T denotes the transpose of the matrix.

In other words, the inverse of a jacket matrix is determined by its element-wise or block-wise inverse. The definition above may also be expressed as:

$$\forall u,v \in \{1,2,\dots,n\}:~a_{iu},a_{iv} \neq 0, ~~~~ \sum_{i=1}^n a_{iu}^{-1}\,a_{iv} =
\begin{cases}
n, & u = v\\
0, & u \neq v
\end{cases}$$

The jacket matrix is a generalization of the Hadamard matrix; it is a diagonal block-wise inverse matrix.

== Motivation ==
| n | .... −2, −1, 0 1, 2,..... | logarithm |
| 2^{n} | ....$\ {1 \over 4}, {1 \over 2},$ 1, 2, 4, ... | series |

As shown in the table, i.e. in the series, for example with n=2, forward: $2^2 = 4$, inverse : $(2^2)^{-1}={1 \over 4}$, then, $4*{1\over 4}=1$. That is, there exists an element-wise inverse.

== Example 1. ==
$A = \left[ \begin{array}{rrrr} 1 & 1 & 1 & 1 \\ 1 & -2 & 2 & -1 \\ 1 & 2 & -2 & -1 \\ 1 & -1 & -1 & 1 \\ \end{array} \right],$:$B ={1 \over 4} \left[ \begin{array}{rrrr} 1 & 1 & 1 & 1 \\[6pt] 1 & -{1 \over 2} & {1 \over 2} & -1 \\[6pt] 1 & {1 \over 2} & -{1 \over 2} & -1 \\[6pt] 1 & -1 & -1 & 1\\[6pt] \end{array} \right].$

or more general

$A = \left[ \begin{array}{rrrr} a & b & b & a \\ b & -c & c & -b \\ b & c & -c & -b \\ a & -b & -b & a \end{array} \right],$:$B = {1 \over 4} \left[ \begin{array}{rrrr} {1 \over a} & {1 \over b} & {1 \over b} & {1 \over a} \\[6pt] {1 \over b} & -{1 \over c} & {1 \over c} & -{1 \over b} \\[6pt] {1 \over b} & {1 \over c} & -{1 \over c} & -{1 \over b} \\[6pt] {1 \over a} & -{1 \over b} & -{1 \over b} & {1 \over a} \end{array} \right],$

== Example 2. ==
For m x m matrices, $\mathbf {A_j},$

$\mathbf {A_j}=\mathrm{diag}(A_1, A_2,.. A_n )$ denotes an mn x mn block diagonal Jacket matrix.

$J_4 = \left[ \begin{array}{rrrr} I_2 & 0 & 0 & 0 \\ 0 & \cos\theta & -\sin\theta & 0 \\ 0 & \sin\theta & \cos\theta & 0 \\ 0 & 0 & 0 & I_2 \end{array} \right],$ $\ J^T_4 J_4 =J_4 J^T_4=I_4.$

== Example 3. ==
Euler's formula:

$e^{i \pi} + 1 = 0$, $e^{i \pi} =\cos{ \pi} +i\sin{\pi}=-1$ and $e^{-i \pi} =\cos{ \pi} - i\sin{\pi}=-1$.

Therefore,

$$e^{i \pi}e^{-i \pi}=(-1)(\frac{1}{-1})=1$$.

Also,

$$y=e^{x}$$
$\frac{dy}{dx}=e^{x}$,$\frac{dy}{dx}\frac{dx}{dy}=e^{x}\frac{1}{e^{x}}=1$.

Finally,

A·B = B·A = I

== Example 4. ==
Consider  
  
    
      
        [
        
          A
        
        
          ]
          
            N
          
        
      
    
    {\displaystyle [\mathbf {A} ]_{N}}
  
 be 2x2 block matrices of order 
  
    
      
        N
        =
        2
        p
      
    
    {\displaystyle N=2p}
  

$$[\mathbf {A}]_N= \left[   \begin{array}{rrrr}   \mathbf {A}_0  &  \mathbf {A}_1 \\   \mathbf {A}_1 &   \mathbf {A}_0 \\  \end{array} \right],$$.

If $[\mathbf {A}_0]_p$ and $[\mathbf {A}_1]_p$ are pxp Jacket matrix, then $[A]_N$ is a block circulant matrix if and only if $\mathbf {A}_0 \mathbf {A}_1^{rt}+\mathbf {A}_1^{rt}\mathbf {A}_0$, where rt denotes the reciprocal transpose.

== Example 5. ==
Let $\mathbf {A}_0= \left[ \begin{array}{rrrr} -1 & 1 \\ 1 & 1\\ \end{array} \right],$ and $\mathbf {A}_1= \left[ \begin{array}{rrrr} -1 & -1 \\ -1 & 1\\ \end{array} \right],$, then the matrix $[\mathbf {A}]_N$ is given by

$$[\mathbf {A}]_4= \left[   \begin{array}{rrrr}   \mathbf {A}_0 &   \mathbf {A}_1 \\   \mathbf {A}_0 &  \mathbf {A}_1 \\  \end{array} \right]
=\left[   \begin{array}{rrrr}   -1 & 1 & -1 & -1\\   1 & 1 & -1 & 1 \\   -1 & 1 & -1 & -1 \\   1 & 1 & -1 & 1 \\  \end{array} \right],$$,
$[\mathbf {A}]_4$⇒$\left[ \begin{array}{rrrr} U & C & A & G\\ \end{array} \right]^T\otimes\left[ \begin{array}{rrrr} U & C & A & G\\ \end{array} \right]\otimes\left[ \begin{array}{rrrr} U & C & A & G\\ \end{array} \right]^T,$

where U, C, A, G denotes the amount of the DNA nucleobases and the matrix $[\mathbf {A}]_4$ is the block circulant Jacket matrix which leads to the principle of the Antagonism with Nirenberg Genetic Code matrix.
