= Fischer's inequality =

Mathematical bound

In mathematics, Fischer's inequality gives an upper bound for the determinant of a positive-semidefinite matrix whose entries are complex numbers in terms of the determinants of its principal diagonal blocks. Suppose A, C are respectively p×p, q×q positive-semidefinite complex matrices and B is a p×q complex matrix. Let

$$M := \left[\begin{matrix} A & B \\ B^* & C \end{matrix}\right]$$

so that M is a (p+q)×(p+q) matrix.

Then Fischer's inequality states that

$$\det (M) \le \det(A) \det(C).$$

If M is positive-definite, equality is achieved in Fischer's inequality if and only if all the entries of B are 0. Inductively one may conclude that a similar inequality holds for a block decomposition of M with multiple principal diagonal blocks. Considering 1×1 blocks, a corollary is Hadamard's inequality. On the other hand, Fischer's inequality can also be proved by using Hadamard's inequality, see the proof of Theorem 7.8.5 in Horn and Johnson's Matrix Analysis.

== Proof ==
Assume that A and C are positive-definite. We have $A^{-1}$ and $C^{-1}$ are positive-definite. Let

$$D := \left[\begin{matrix} A & 0 \\ 0 & C \end{matrix}\right].$$

We note that

$$D^{-\frac{1}{2}} M D^{-\frac{1}{2} } = \left[\begin{matrix} A^{-\frac{1}{2}} & 0 \\ 0 & C^{-\frac{1}{2}} \end{matrix}\right] \left[\begin{matrix} A & B \\ B^* & C \end{matrix}\right] \left[\begin{matrix} A^{-\frac{1}{2}} & 0 \\ 0 & C^{-\frac{1}{2}} \end{matrix}\right] = \left[\begin{matrix} I_{p} & A^{-\frac{1}{2}} BC^{-\frac{1}{2}} \\ C^{-\frac{1}{2}}B^*A^{-\frac{1}{2}} & I_{q}\end{matrix}\right]$$

Applying the AM-GM inequality to the eigenvalues of $D^{-\frac{1}{2}} M D^{-\frac{1}{2} }$, we see

$$\det (D^{-\frac{1}{2}} M D^{-\frac{1}{2}}) \le \left({1 \over p + q} \mathrm{tr} (D^{-\frac{1}{2}} M D^{-\frac{1}{2}}) \right)^{p+q} = 1^{p+q} = 1.$$

By multiplicativity of determinant, we have

$$\begin{align}
\det(D^{-\frac{1}{2}} ) \det(M) \det(D^{-\frac{1}{2}} ) \le 1 \\
\Longrightarrow \det(M) \le \det(D) = \det(A) \det(C).
\end{align}$$

In this case, equality holds if and only if M = D that is, all entries of B are 0.

For $\varepsilon > 0$, as $A + \varepsilon I_p$ and $C + \varepsilon I_q$ are positive-definite, we have

$$\det(M+ \varepsilon I_{p+q}) \le \det(A + \varepsilon I_p) \det(C + \varepsilon I_q).$$

Taking the limit as $\varepsilon \rightarrow 0$ proves the inequality. From the inequality we note that if M is invertible, then both A and C are invertible and we get the desired equality condition.

== Improvements ==
If M can be partitioned in square blocks M_{ij}, then the following inequality by Thompson is valid:

$$\det(M) \leq \det([\det(M_{ij})])$$

where [det(M_{ij})] is the matrix whose (i,j) entry is det(M_{ij}).

In particular, if the block matrices B and C are also square matrices, then the following inequality by Everett is valid:

$$\det(M) \le \det \begin{bmatrix} \det(A) && \det(B) \\ \det(B^*) && \det(C) \end{bmatrix}$$

Thompson's inequality can also be generalized by an inequality in terms of the coefficients of the characteristic polynomial of the block matrices. Expressing the characteristic polynomial of the matrix A as

$$p_A (t) = \sum_{k=0}^n t^{n-k} (-1)^k \operatorname{tr}(\Lambda^k A)$$

and supposing that the blocks M_{ij} are m x m matrices, the following inequality by Lin and Zhang is valid:

$$\det(M) \le \left(\frac{\det([\operatorname{tr}(\Lambda^r M_{ij}]))}{ \binom{m}r} \right)^{\frac{m}{r}},\quad r=1, \ldots, m$$

Note that if r = m, then this inequality is identical to Thompson's inequality.

== See also ==
- Hadamard's inequality
