= Cauchy–Hadamard theorem =

Theorem about the radii of convergence of power series

In mathematics, the Cauchy–Hadamard theorem is a result in complex analysis named after the French mathematicians Augustin Louis Cauchy and Jacques Hadamard, describing the radius of convergence of a power series. It was published in 1821 by Cauchy, but remained relatively unknown until Hadamard rediscovered it. Hadamard's first publication of this result was in 1888; he also included it as part of his 1892 Ph.D. thesis.

== Theorem for one complex variable ==
Consider the formal power series in one complex variable z of the form
$$f(z) = \sum_{n = 0}^{\infty} c_{n} (z-a)^{n}$$
where $a, c_n \in \Complex.$

Then the radius of convergence $R$ of f at the point a is given by
$$\frac{1}{R} = \limsup_{n \to \infty} \left( | c_{n} |^{1/n} \right)$$
where lim sup denotes the limit superior, the limit as n approaches infinity of the supremum of the sequence values after the nth position. If the sequence values is unbounded so that the lim sup is ∞, then the power series does not converge near a, while if the lim sup is 0 then the radius of convergence is ∞, meaning that the series converges on the entire plane.

=== Proof ===
Without loss of generality assume that $a=0$. We will show first that the power series $\sum_n c_n z^n$ converges for $|z|<R$, and then that it diverges for $|z|>R$.

First suppose $|z|<R$. Let $t=1/R$ not be $0$ or $\pm\infty.$ For any $\varepsilon > 0$, there exists only a finite number of $n$ such that $\sqrt[n]{|c_n|} \geq t+\varepsilon$. Now $|c_n| < (t+\varepsilon)^n$ for all but a finite number of $c_n$, so the series $\sum_n c_n z^n$ converges if $|z| < 1/(t+\varepsilon)$. This proves the first part.

Conversely, for $\varepsilon > 0$, $|c_n|\geq (t-\varepsilon)^n$ for infinitely many $c_n$, so if $|z|=1/(t-\varepsilon) > R$, we see that the series cannot converge because its nth term does not tend to 0.

== Theorem for several complex variables ==
Let $\alpha$ be an n-dimensional vector of natural numbers ($\alpha = (\alpha_1, \cdots, \alpha_n) \in \N^n$) with $\|\alpha\| := \alpha_1 + \cdots + \alpha_n$, then $f(z)$ converges with radius of convergence $\rho = (\rho_1, \cdots, \rho_n) \in \R^n$, $\rho^\alpha = \rho_1^{\alpha_1} \cdots \rho_n^{\alpha_n}$ if and only if
$$\limsup_{\|\alpha\|\to\infty} \sqrt[\|\alpha\|]{|c_\alpha|\rho^\alpha}=1$$
of the multidimensional power series
$$f(z) = \sum_{\alpha\geq0}c_\alpha(z-a)^\alpha := \sum_{\alpha_1\geq0,\ldots,\alpha_n\geq0}c_{\alpha_1,\ldots,\alpha_n}(z_1-a_1)^{\alpha_1}\cdots(z_n-a_n)^{\alpha_n}.$$

=== Proof ===
From

Set $z = a + t\rho$ $(z_i = a_i + t\rho_i).$ Then

$$\sum_{\alpha \geq 0} c_\alpha (z - a)^\alpha = \sum_{\alpha \geq 0} c_\alpha \rho^\alpha t^{\|\alpha\|} = \sum_{\mu \geq 0} \left( \sum_{\|\alpha\| = \mu} |c_\alpha| \rho^\alpha \right) t^\mu.$$

This is a power series in one variable $t$ which converges for $|t| < 1$ and diverges for $|t| > 1$. Therefore, by the Cauchy–Hadamard theorem for one variable

$$\limsup_{\mu \to \infty} \sqrt[\mu]{\sum_{\|\alpha\| = \mu} |c_\alpha| \rho^\alpha} = 1.$$

Setting $|c_m| \rho^m = \max_{\|\alpha\| = \mu} |c_\alpha| \rho^\alpha$ gives us an estimate

$$|c_m| \rho^m \leq \sum_{\|\alpha\| = \mu} |c_\alpha| \rho^\alpha \leq (\mu + 1)^n |c_m| \rho^m.$$

Because $\sqrt[\mu]{(\mu + 1)^n} \to 1$ as $\mu \to \infty$

$$\sqrt[\mu]{|c_m| \rho^m} \leq \sqrt[\mu]{\sum_{\|\alpha\| = \mu} |c_\alpha| \rho^\alpha} \leq \sqrt[\mu]{|c_m| \rho^m} \implies \sqrt[\mu]{\sum_{\|\alpha\| = \mu} |c_\alpha| \rho^\alpha} = \sqrt[\mu]{|c_m| \rho^m} \qquad (\mu \to \infty).$$

Therefore

$$\limsup_{\|\alpha\|\to\infty} \sqrt[\|\alpha\|]{|c_\alpha|\rho^\alpha} = \limsup_{\mu \to \infty} \sqrt[\mu]{|c_m| \rho^m} = 1.$$
