= Jacques Hadamard =

French mathematician (1865–1963)

Jacques Hadamard ForMemRS
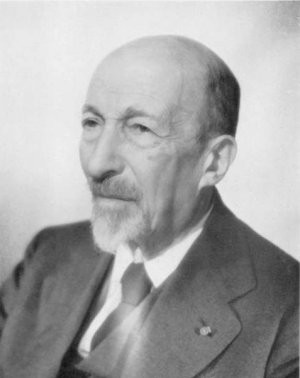
- Hadamard c. 1950
- Born: 8 December 1865; Versailles, France
- Died: 17 October 1963 (aged 97); Paris, France
- Education: École Normale Supérieure
- Known for: Cauchy–Hadamard theorem Hadamard factorization theorem Proof of prime number theorem Hadamard matrices Hadamard's maximal determinant problem
- Awards: Grand Prix des Sciences Mathématiques (1892); Prix Poncelet (1898); CNRS Gold medal (1956)
- Scientific career
- Fields: Mathematics
- Workplaces: University of Bordeaux; Sorbonne; Collège de France; École Polytechnique; École Centrale Paris
- Thesis: Essai sur l'étude des fonctions données par leur développement de Taylor (1892)
- Doctoral advisor: C. Émile Picard; Jules Tannery
- Doctoral students: Maurice René Fréchet; Marc Krasner; Paul Lévy; Szolem Mandelbrojt; André Weil

Jacques Salomon Hadamard (French: [adamaʁ]; 8 December 1865 – 17 October 1963) was a French mathematician who made major contributions in complex analysis, number theory, differential geometry, and partial differential equations.

== Biography ==
The son of a teacher, Amédée Hadamard, of Jewish descent, and Claire Marie Jeanne Picard, Hadamard was born in Versailles, France and attended the Lycée Charlemagne and Lycée Louis-le-Grand, where his father taught. In 1884 Hadamard entered the École Normale Supérieure, having placed first in the entrance examinations both there and at the École Polytechnique. His teachers included Tannery, Hermite, Darboux, Appell, Goursat, and Picard. He published his famous thesis in 1892 containing the Hadamard gap theorem, the Cauchy–Hadamard theorem, Hadamard's theorem on the radius of meromorphy and the Hadamard fractional integral. Later that year, he was awarded the Grand Prix des Sciences Mathématiques for a memoir containing the Hadamard factorization theorem that applies it and the results of his thesis to the Riemann zeta function.

In 1892, Hadamard married Louise-Anna Trénel, also of Jewish descent, with whom he had three sons and two daughters. The following year he took up a lectureship in the University of Bordeaux, where he proved his celebrated inequality on determinants, which led to the discovery of Hadamard matrices when equality holds. In 1896 he made two important contributions: he proved the prime number theorem, using complex function theory (also proved independently by Charles Jean de la Vallée-Poussin); and he was awarded the Bordin Prize of the French Academy of Sciences for his work on geodesics in the differential geometry of surfaces and dynamical systems. In the same year he was appointed Professor of Astronomy and Rational Mechanics in Bordeaux. His foundational work on geometry and symbolic dynamics continued in 1898 with the study of geodesics on surfaces of negative curvature. For his cumulative work, he was awarded the Prix Poncelet in 1898.

After the Dreyfus affair, which involved him personally because his second cousin Lucie was the wife of Dreyfus, Hadamard became politically active and a staunch supporter of Jewish causes though he professed to be an atheist in his religion.

In 1897 he moved back to Paris, holding positions in the Sorbonne and the Collège de France, where he was appointed Professor of Mechanics in 1909. In addition to this post, he was appointed to chairs of analysis at the École Polytechnique in 1912 and at the École Centrale in 1920, succeeding Jordan and Appell. In Paris Hadamard concentrated his interests on the problems of mathematical physics, in particular partial differential equations, the calculus of variations and the foundations of functional analysis. He introduced the idea of well-posed problem and the method of descent in the theory of partial differential equations, culminating in his seminal book on the subject, based on lectures given at Yale University in 1922. Later in his life he wrote on probability theory and mathematical education.

Hadamard was elected to the French Academy of Sciences in 1916, in succession to Poincaré, whose complete works he helped edit. He became foreign member of the Royal Netherlands Academy of Arts and Sciences in 1920. He was elected a foreign member of the Academy of Sciences of the USSR in 1929. He visited the Soviet Union in 1930 and 1934 and China in 1936 at the invitation of Soviet and Chinese mathematicians.

Hadamard stayed in France at the beginning of the Second World War and escaped to southern France in 1940. The Vichy government permitted him to leave for the United States in 1941 and he obtained a visiting position at Columbia University in New York. He moved to London in 1944 and returned to France when the war ended in 1945.

Hadamard was awarded an honorary doctorate (LL.D.) by Yale University in October 1901, during celebrations for the bicentenary of the university. He was awarded the CNRS Gold medal for his lifetime achievements in 1956. He died in Paris in 1963, aged ninety-seven.

Hadamard's students included Maurice Fréchet, Paul Lévy, Szolem Mandelbrojt, and André Weil.

== On creativity ==
In his book Psychology of Invention in the Mathematical Field, Hadamard uses the results of introspection to study mathematical thought processes, and tries to report and interpret observations, personal or gathered from other scholars engaged in the work of invention. In sharp contrast to authors who identify language and cognition, he describes his own mathematical thinking as largely wordless, often accompanied by mental images that represent the entire solution to a problem. He surveyed 100 of the leading physicists of the day (approximately 1900), asking them how they did their work.

Hadamard described the experiences of the mathematicians/theoretical physicists Carl Friedrich Gauss, Hermann von Helmholtz, Henri Poincaré and others as viewing entire solutions with "sudden spontaneousness".

Hadamard described the process as having four steps of the five-step Graham Wallas creative process model, with the first three also having been put forth by Helmholtz: Preparation, Incubation, Illumination, and Verification (Wallas' five stages added "Intimation" prior to Illumination, a sudden feeling of being about to find the solution to a problem).

== Publications ==
- An Essay on the Psychology of Invention in the Mathematical Field. Princeton University Press, 1945; new edition under the title The Mathematician's Mind: The Psychology of Invention in the Mathematical Field, 1996; ISBN 0-691-02931-8, Online
- Le problème de Cauchy et les équations aux dérivées partielles linéaires hyperboliques, Hermann 1932 (Lectures given at Yale, Eng. trans. Lectures on Cauchy's problem in linear partial differential equations, Yale University Press, Oxford University Press 1923, Reprint Dover 2003)
- La série de Taylor et son prolongement analytique, 2nd edn., Gauthier-Villars 1926
- La théorie des équations aux dérivées partielles, Peking, Editions Scientifiques, 1964
- Leçons sur le calcul des variations, Vol. 1, Paris, Hermann 1910, Online
- Leçons sur la propagation des ondes et les équations de l'hydrodynamique, Paris, Hermann 1903, Online
- Four lectures on Mathematics, delivered at Columbia University 1911, Columbia University Press 1915 (1. The definition of solutions of linear partial differential equations by boundary conditions, 2. Contemporary researches in differential equations, integral equations and integro-differential equations, 3. Analysis Situs in connection with correspondences and differential equations, 4. Elementary solutions of partial differential equations and Greens functions), Online
- Leçons de géométrie élémentaire, 2 vols., Paris, Colin, 1898, 1906 (Eng. trans: Lessons in Geometry, American Mathematical Society 2008), Vol. 1, Vol. 2
- Cours d'analyse professé à l'École polytechnique, 2 vols., Paris, Hermann 1925/27, 1930 (Vol. 1: Compléments de calcul différentiel, intégrales simples et multiples, applications analytiques et géométriques, équations différentielles élémentaires, Vol. 2: Potentiel, calcul des variations, fonctions analytiques, équations différentielles et aux dérivées partielles, calcul des probabilités)
- Essai sur l'étude des fonctions données par leur développement de Taylor. Étude sur les propriétés des fonctions entières et en particulier d'une fonction considérée par Riemann, 1893, Online
- "Étude sur les propriétés des fonctions entières et en particulier d'une fonction considérée par Riemann". Journal de mathématiques pures et appliquées: 171–216. 1893.
- Sur la distribution des zéros de la fonction $\zeta(s)$ et ses conséquences arithmétiques, Bulletin de la Société Mathématique de France, Vol. 24, 1896, pp. 199–220 Online
- Hadamard, Jacques (2003) [1923]. Lectures on Cauchy's problem in linear partial differential equations. Dover Phoenix editions. Dover Publications, New York. ISBN 978-0-486-49549-1. JFM 49.0725.04. MR 0051411.
- Hadamard, Jacques (1999) [1951]. Non-Euclidean geometry in the theory of automorphic functions. History of Mathematics. Vol. 17. Providence, R.I.: American Mathematical Society. ISBN 978-0-8218-2030-8. MR 1723250.
- Hadamard, Jacques (2008) [1947]. Lessons in geometry. I. Providence, R.I.: American Mathematical Society. doi:10.1090/mbk/057. ISBN 978-0-8218-4367-3. MR 2463454.
- Hadamard, Jacques (1968). Fréchet, M.; Lévy, P.; Mandelbrojt, S.; et al. (eds.). Œuvres de Jacques Hadamard. Tomes I, II, III, IV. Éditions du Centre National de la Recherche Scientifique, Paris. MR 0230598.

== See also ==
- List of things named after Jacques Hadamard

== Sources ==
- Cartwright, M. L. (1965). "Jacques Hadamard. 1865-1963". Biographical Memoirs of Fellows of the Royal Society. 11: 75–99. doi:10.1098/rsbm.1965.0005.
