= Hadamard's method of descent =

Method for solving partial differential equations

In mathematics, the method of descent is the term coined by the French mathematician Jacques Hadamard as a method for solving a partial differential equation in several real or complex variables, by regarding it as the specialisation of an equation in more variables, constant in the extra parameters. This method has been used to solve the wave equation, the heat equation and other versions of the Cauchy initial value problem.

As Hadamard (1923) wrote:

We thus have a first example of what I shall call a 'method of descent'. Creating a phrase for an idea which is merely childish and has been used since the first steps of the theory is, I must confess, rather ambitious; but we shall come across it rather frequently, so that it will be convenient to have a word to denote it. It consists in noticing that he who can do more can do less: if we can integrate equations with m variables, we can do the same for equations with (m – 1) variables.
