= Complex Hadamard matrix =

A complex Hadamard matrix is any complex $N \times N$ matrix $H$ satisfying two conditions:

- unimodularity (the modulus of each entry is unity): $|H_{jk}| = 1 \text{ for } j,k = 1,2,\dots,N$
- orthogonality: $HH^{\dagger} = NI$,

where $\dagger$ denotes the Hermitian transpose of $H$ and $I$ is the identity matrix. The concept is a generalization of Hadamard matrices. Note that any complex Hadamard matrix $H$ can be made into a unitary matrix by multiplying it by $\frac{1}{\sqrt{N}}$; conversely, any unitary matrix whose entries all have modulus $\frac{1}{\sqrt{N}}$ becomes a complex Hadamard upon multiplication by $\sqrt{N}.$

Complex Hadamard matrices arise in the study of operator algebras and the theory of quantum computation. Real Hadamard matrices and Butson-type Hadamard matrices form particular cases of complex Hadamard matrices.

Complex Hadamard matrices exist for any natural number $N$ (compare with the real case, in which Hadamard matrices do not exist for every $N$ and existence is not known for every permissible $N$). For instance the Fourier matrices (the complex conjugate of the DFT matrices without the normalizing factor),

$$[F_N]_{jk}:= \exp[2\pi i (j-1)(k-1)/N]
{\quad \rm for \quad} j,k=1,2,\dots,N$$

belong to this class.

== Equivalency ==
Two complex Hadamard matrices are called equivalent, written $H_1 \simeq H_2$, if there exist diagonal unitary matrices $D_1, D_2$ and permutation matrices $P_1, P_2$ such that

$$H_1 = D_1 P_1 H_2 P_2 D_2.$$

Any complex Hadamard matrix is equivalent to a dephased Hadamard matrix, in which all elements in the first row and first column are equal to unity.

For $N=2,3$ and $5$ all complex Hadamard matrices are equivalent to the Fourier matrix $F_{N}$. For $N=4$ there exists a continuous, one-parameter family of inequivalent complex Hadamard matrices,

$$F_{4}^{(1)}(a):=
\begin{bmatrix} 1 & 1       & 1  & 1 \\
1 & ie^{ia} & -1 & -ie^{ia} \\
1 & -1      & 1  &-1 \\
1 & -ie^{ia}& -1 & i e^{ia}
\end{bmatrix}
{\quad \rm with \quad } a\in [0,\pi) .$$

For $N=6$ the following families of complex Hadamard matrices are known:

- a single two-parameter family which includes $F_6$,
- a single one-parameter family $D_6(t)$,
- a one-parameter orbit $B_6(\theta)$, including the circulant Hadamard matrix $C_6$,
- a two-parameter orbit including the previous two examples $X_6(\alpha)$,
- a one-parameter orbit $M_6(x)$ of symmetric matrices,
- a two-parameter orbit including the previous example $K_6(x,y)$,
- a three-parameter orbit including all the previous examples $K_6(x,y,z)$,
- a further construction with four degrees of freedom, $G_6$, yielding other examples than $K_6(x,y,z)$,
- a single point - one of the Butson-type Hadamard matrices, $S_6 \in H(3,6)$.

It is not known, however, if this list is complete, but it is conjectured that $K_6(x,y,z),G_6,S_6$ is an exhaustive (but not necessarily irredundant) list of all complex Hadamard matrices of order 6.
