= Hadamard's inequality =

Theorem

In mathematics, Hadamard's inequality (also known as Hadamard's theorem on determinants) is a result first published by Jacques Hadamard in 1893. It is a bound on the determinant of a matrix whose entries are complex numbers in terms of the lengths of its column vectors. In geometrical terms, when restricted to real numbers, it bounds the volume in Euclidean space of n dimensions marked out by n vectors v_{i} for 1 ≤ i ≤ n in terms of the lengths of these vectors ‖v_{i}‖.

Specifically, Hadamard's inequality states that if N is the matrix having columns v_{i}, then

$$\left| \det(N) \right| \le \prod_{i=1}^n \|v_i\|.$$

If the n vectors are non-zero, equality in Hadamard's inequality is achieved if and only if the vectors are orthogonal.

== Alternate forms and corollaries ==
A corollary is that if the entries of an n by n matrix N are bounded by B, so |N_{ij}| ≤ B for all i and j, then

$$\left| \det(N) \right| \le B^n n^{n/2}.$$

In particular, if the entries of N are +1 and −1 only then

$$\left| \det(N) \right| \le n^{n/2}.$$

In combinatorics, matrices N for which equality holds, i.e. those with orthogonal columns, are called Hadamard matrices.

More generally, suppose that N is a complex matrix of order n, whose entries are bounded by |N_{ij}| ≤ 1, for each i, j between 1 and n. Then Hadamard's inequality states that

$$|\operatorname{det}(N)| \leq n^{n/2}.$$

Equality in this bound is attained for a real matrix N if and only if N is a Hadamard matrix.

A positive-semidefinite matrix P can be written as N^{*}N, where N^{*} denotes the conjugate transpose of N (see Decomposition of a semidefinite matrix). Then

$$\det(P)=\det(N)^2 \le \prod_{i=1}^n \|v_i\|^2 = \prod_{i=1}^n p_{ii}.$$

So, the determinant of a positive definite matrix is less than or equal to the product of its diagonal entries. Sometimes this is also known as Hadamard's inequality.

== Proof ==
The result is trivial if the matrix N is singular, so assume the columns of N are linearly independent. By dividing each column by its Euclidean norm, it can be seen that the result is equivalent to the special case where each column has norm 1, in other words if e_{i} are unit vectors and M is the matrix having the e_{i} as columns then

$\left| \det M \right| \le 1,$	1

and equality is achieved if and only if the vectors are an orthogonal set. The general result now follows:

$$\left| \det N \right| = \bigg (\prod_{i=1}^n \|v_i\| \bigg) \left|\det M\right| \leq \prod_{i=1}^n \|v_i\|.$$

To prove (1), consider P =M^{*}M where M^{*} is the conjugate transpose of M, and let the eigenvalues of P be λ_{1}, λ_{2}, … λ_{n}. Since the length of each column of M is 1, each entry in the diagonal of P is 1, so the trace of P is n. Applying the inequality of arithmetic and geometric means,

$$\det P = \prod_{i=1}^n \lambda_i \le \left({1 \over n}\sum_{i=1}^n \lambda_i\right)^n = \left({1 \over n} \operatorname{tr} P \right)^n = 1^n = 1,$$

so

$$\left| \det M \right| = \sqrt{\det P} \le 1.$$

If there is equality then each of the λ_{i}'s must all be equal and their sum is n, so they must all be 1. The matrix P is Hermitian, therefore diagonalizable, so it is the identity matrix—in other words the columns of M are an orthonormal set and the columns of N are an orthogonal set. Many other proofs can be found in the literature.

== See also ==
- Fischer's inequality
