= Butson-type Hadamard matrix =

In mathematics, a complex Hadamard matrix H of size N with all its columns (rows) mutually orthogonal, belongs to the Butson-type H(q, N) if all its elements are powers of q-th root of unity,

$$(H_{jk})^q = 1 \quad\text{for}\quad j,k = 1,2,\dots,N.$$

== Existence ==
If p is prime and $N>1$, then $H(p,N)$ can exist only for $N = mp$ with integer m and it is conjectured they exist for all such cases with $p \ge 3$. For $p=2$, the corresponding conjecture is existence for all multiples of 4. In general, the problem of finding all sets $\{q,N \}$ such that the Butson-type matrices $H(q,N)$ exist, remains open.

== Examples ==
- $H(2,N)$ contains real Hadamard matrices of size N,
- $H(4,N)$ contains Hadamard matrices composed of $\pm 1, \pm i$ – such matrices were called by Turyn, complex Hadamard matrices.
- in the limit $q \to \infty$ one can approximate all complex Hadamard matrices.
- Fourier matrices $[F_N]_{jk}:= \exp[(2\pi i (j-1)(k-1)/N] \text{ for }j,k = 1,2,\dots,N$

belong to the Butson-type,

$$F_N \in H(N,N),$$

while

$$F_N \otimes F_N \in H(N,N^2),$$

$$F_N \otimes F_N\otimes F_N \in H(N,N^3).$$

$$D_6 := \begin{bmatrix}
1 &  1  & 1  & 1 & 1  & 1 \\
1 & -1  & i  & -i& -i & i \\
1 &  i  &-1  &  i& -i &-i \\
1 & -i  & i  & -1&  i &-i \\
1 & -i  &-i  &  i& -1 & i \\
1 &  i  &-i  & -i&  i & -1 \\
\end{bmatrix}
\in\, H(4,6)$$,

$$S_6 := \begin{bmatrix}
1 &  1  & 1  & 1 & 1  & 1  \\
1 &  1  & z  & z & z^2 & z^2 \\
1 &  z  & 1  & z^2&z^2 & z \\
1 &  z  & z^2&  1&  z & z^2 \\
1 &  z^2& z^2&  z&  1 & z \\
1 &  z^2& z  & z^2& z & 1 \\
\end{bmatrix}
\in\, H(3,6)$$

where $z =\exp(2\pi i/3).$
