= Quincunx matrix =

2x2 matrix with 1 and -1 coefficients

In mathematics, the matrix

$$\begin{pmatrix}
1 & -1 \\
1 & 1
\end{pmatrix}$$

is sometimes called the quincunx matrix. It is a 2×2 Hadamard matrix, and its rows form the basis of a diagonal square lattice consisting of the integer points whose coordinates both have the same parity; this lattice is a two-dimensional analogue of the three-dimensional body-centered cubic lattice.

== See also ==
- Quincunx
