= Power of three =

Three raised to an integer power

81 (3^{4}) combinations of weights of 1 (3^{0}), 3 (3^{1}), 9 (3^{2}) and 27 (3^{3}) kg – each weight on the left pan, right pan or unused – allow integer weights from −40 to +40 kg to be balanced; the figure shows the positive values

In mathematics, a power of three is a number of the form 3^{n} where n is an integer, that is, the result of exponentiation with number three as the base and integer n as the exponent. The first ten non-negative powers of three are:

1, 3, 9, 27, 81, 243, 729, 2187, 6561, 19683, etc. (sequence A000244 in OEIS)

== Applications ==
The powers of three give the place values in the ternary numeral system.

=== Graph theory ===
In graph theory, powers of three appear in the Moon–Moser bound 3^{n/3} on the number of maximal independent sets of an n-vertex graph, and in the time analysis of the Bron–Kerbosch algorithm for finding these sets. Several important strongly regular graphs also have a number of vertices that is a power of three, including the Brouwer–Haemers graph (81 vertices), Berlekamp–van Lint–Seidel graph (243 vertices), and Games graph (729 vertices).

=== Enumerative combinatorics ===
In enumerative combinatorics, there are 3^{n} signed subsets of a set of n elements. In polyhedral combinatorics, the hypercube and all other Hanner polytopes have a number of faces (not counting the empty set as a face) that is a power of three. For example, a 2-cube, or square, has 4 vertices, 4 edges and 1 face, and 4 + 4 + 1 = 3^{2}. Kalai's 3^{d} conjecture states that this is the minimum possible number of faces for a centrally symmetric polytope.

=== Inverse power of three lengths ===
In recreational mathematics and fractal geometry, inverse power-of-three lengths occur in the constructions leading to the Koch snowflake, Cantor set, Sierpinski carpet and Menger sponge, in the number of elements in the construction steps for a Sierpinski triangle, and in many formulas related to these sets. There are 3^{n} possible states in an n-disk Tower of Hanoi puzzle or vertices in its associated Hanoi graph. In a balance puzzle with w weighing steps, there are 3^{w} possible outcomes (sequences where the scale tilts left or right or stays balanced); powers of three often arise in the solutions to these puzzles, and it has been suggested that (for similar reasons) the powers of three would make an ideal system of coins.

=== Perfect totient numbers ===
In number theory, all powers of three are perfect totient numbers. The sums of distinct powers of three form a Stanley sequence, the lexicographically smallest sequence that does not contain an arithmetic progression of three elements. A conjecture of Paul Erdős states that this sequence contains no powers of two other than 1, 4, and 256.

=== Graham's number ===
Graham's number, an enormous number arising from a proof in Ramsey theory, is (in the version popularized by Martin Gardner) a power of three. However, the actual publication of the proof by Ronald Graham used a different number which is a power of two and much smaller.

== See also ==
- Power of 10
- Power of two
- Square root of 3
