= Joy Morris =

Canadian mathematician

Joy Morris (born 1970) is a Canadian mathematician whose research involves group theory, graph theory, and the connections between the two through Cayley graphs. She is also interested in mathematics education, is the author of two open-access undergraduate mathematics textbooks, and oversees a program in which university mathematics education students provide a drop-in mathematics tutoring service for parents of middle school students. She is a professor of mathematics at the University of Lethbridge.

== Education and career ==
Morris is originally from Toronto, Ontario. Both her parents had doctorates; she was the youngest of their four children, another of whom also earned a Ph.D.. She was educated through various alternative-education and gifted-student programs in the Toronto public school system. She graduated from Trent University in 1992 with a double major in mathematics and English, and with fourth-year honours in mathematics earned in part through a summer research project with Brian Alspach at Simon Fraser University.

She entered graduate study directly after graduating, continuing to work with Alspach at Simon Fraser, and completed her doctorate in 2000 with a dissertation on Isomorphisms of Cayley Graphs. Morris joined the Lethbridge faculty in 2000, and was promoted to full professor in 2015. As of 2017 her position as a professor at Lethbridge was for half-time.

== Mathematics education ==
In 2017, after learning about the frustrating experiences of her middle-school daughter's friends' parents, Morris founded a drop-in mathematics tutoring center through the University of Lethbridge, in which Lethbridge mathematics education students would tutor middle-school parents on the mathematics their children were learning, and provide educational activities for the parents to do with their children. The program was successful, and has continued in subsequent years.

== Other contributions ==
Morris's results in groups, graphs, and the symmetries of groups and graphs include a proof of Toida's conjecture according to which, for certain circulant graphs (the Cayley graphs of finite cyclic groups), every symmetry of the graph comes from a symmetry of the underlying group. According to Toida's conjecture, this equivalence between group and graph symmetries should be valid when all of the members of the generating set of the group used to construct the graph are individually generators of the group.

Morris has written two open textbooks in mathematics for the undergraduate students at Lethbridge. They are:

- Proofs and Concepts: the fundamentals of abstract mathematics (with Dave Witte Morris, 2013)
- Combinatorics: an upper-level introductory course in enumeration, graph theory, and design theory (2017)
