= Conway's 99-graph problem =

On existence of a strongly regular graph

Unsolved problem in mathematics
Does there exist a strongly regular graph with parameters (99,14,1,2)?
More unsolved problems in mathematics

A 9-vertex graph in which every edge belongs to a unique triangle and every non-edge is the diagonal of a unique quadrilateral. The 99-graph problem asks for a 99-vertex graph with the same property.

In graph theory, Conway's 99-graph problem is an unsolved problem asking whether there exists an undirected graph with 99 vertices, in which each two adjacent vertices have exactly one common neighbor, and in which each two non-adjacent vertices have exactly two common neighbors. Equivalently, every edge should be part of a unique triangle and every non-adjacent pair should be one of the two diagonals of a unique 4-cycle. John Horton Conway offered a $1000 prize for its solution.

== Properties ==
If such a graph exists, it would necessarily be a locally linear graph and a strongly regular graph with parameters (99,14,1,2). The first, third, and fourth parameters encode the statement of the problem: the graph should have 99 vertices, every pair of adjacent vertices should have 1 common neighbor, and every pair of non-adjacent vertices should have 2 common neighbors. The second parameter means that the graph is a regular graph with 14 edges per vertex.

If this graph exists, it cannot have symmetries that take every vertex to every other vertex. Additional restrictions on its possible groups of symmetries are known.

== History ==
The possibility of a graph with these parameters was already suggested in 1969 by Norman L. Biggs, and its existence noted as an open problem by others before Conway. Conway himself had worked on the problem as early as 1975, but offered the prize in 2014 as part of a set of problems posed in the DIMACS Conference on Challenges of Identifying Integer Sequences. Other problems in the set include the thrackle conjecture, the minimum spacing of Danzer sets, and the question of who wins after the move 16 in the game sylver coinage.

== Related graphs ==
More generally, there are only five possible combinations of parameters for which a strongly regular graph could exist with each edge in a unique triangle and each non-edge forming the diagonal of a unique quadrilateral. It is only known that graphs exist with two of these five combinations. These two graphs are the nine-vertex Paley graph (the graph of the 3-3 duoprism) with parameters (9,4,1,2) and the Berlekamp–van Lint–Seidel graph with parameters (243,22,1,2). The parameters for which graphs are unknown are: (99,14,1,2), (6273,112,1,2) and (494019,994,1,2). The 99-graph problem describes the smallest of these combinations of parameters for which the existence of a graph is unknown.
