= Antisymmetric =

Antisymmetric or skew-symmetric may refer to:

- Antisymmetry in linguistics
- Antisymmetry in physics
- Antisymmetric relation in mathematics
- Skew-symmetric graph
- Self-complementary graph

In mathematics, especially linear algebra, and in theoretical physics, the adjective antisymmetric (or skew-symmetric) is used for matrices, tensors, and other objects that change sign if an appropriate operation (e.g. matrix transposition) is performed. See:

- Skew-symmetric matrix (a matrix A for which A^{T} = −A)
- Skew-symmetric bilinear form is a bilinear form B such that B(x, y) = −B(y, x) for all x and y.
- Antisymmetric tensor in matrices and index subsets.
- "antisymmetric function" – odd function

== See also ==
- Anticommutative property
- Symmetry in mathematics
