= Vitold Belevitch =

Belgian mathematician (1921–1999)

- Belevitch in an undated photo
- Born: 2 March 1921; Terijoki, Karelia, Finland
- Died: 26 December 1999 (aged 78)
- Education: Université de Namur; Catholic University of Leuven
- Known for: Belevitch's theorem; Scattering parameters; Network synthesis
- Awards: IEEE Centennial Medal (1984)
- Scientific career
- Fields: Mathematics; Electrical engineering
- Workplaces: Bell Telephone Manufacturing Company; Philips Research Laboratories Belgium
- Thesis: Insertion loss and effective phase-shift in composite filters at cut-off frequency (1945)
- Doctoral advisor: Charles Lambert Manneback; Wilhelm Cauer

Vitold Belevitch (2 March 1921 – 26 December 1999) was a Belgian mathematician and electrical engineer of Russian origin who produced some important work in the field of electrical network theory. Born to parents fleeing the Bolsheviks, he settled in Belgium where he worked on early computer construction projects. Belevitch is responsible for a number of circuit theorems and introduced the now well-known scattering parameters.

Belevitch had an interest in languages and found a mathematical derivation of Zipf's law. He also published on machine languages. Another field of interest was transmission lines, where he published on line coupling. He worked on telephone conferencing and introduced the mathematical construct of the conference matrix.

== Early life ==
Belevitch was born 2 March 1921 in Terijoki, Karelia, now incorporated into Russia, but at the time part of Finland. Belevitch's parents were Russian and his mother was an ethnic Pole. They were attempting to flee from their home in Petrograd (Saint Petersburg) in Russia to escape the Bolshevik revolution, which Belevitch's father opposed. Belevitch's heavily pregnant mother succeeded in crossing the border into Finland and continued on to Helsinki after Vitold was born, where the birth was registered. She headed for Helsinki because her husband's father was principal of the Russian school there. Belevitch's father was arrested before he could follow and was deported to Siberia, where he died without ever seeing his son.

In 1926 Belevitch, while still a small child, emigrated with his mother to Belgium.

== Education ==
Belevitch was educated in French in Belgium, until July 1936 at the Notre-Dame de la Paix College at Namur. In 1937, aged 16, he enrolled at the Université Catholique de Louvain where he studied electrical and mechanical engineering, graduating in 1942. Belevitch gained his PhD in applied sciences at the same university in 1945. His sponsor was Charles Lambert Manneback and his second advisor was Wilhelm Cauer, the founder of the field of network synthesis.

From 1953 until 1985 Belevitch lectured at the university. He taught circuit theory and other mathematical subjects related to electrical science. In 1960 he became a special professor (buitengewoon hoogleraar). Although Belevitch worked as an electrical engineer, his primary interest was mathematics, especially algebra. There was a tradition in Belgium of the most gifted mathematicians entering engineering rather than pure mathematics or physics. Belevitch showed his mathematical leanings by preferring the use of blackboard and chalk to any audio-visual aids during lectures. He even lectured in this way when presenting the opening lecture to a large audience at an international conference at the IEE in London.

== Career ==
Young Belevitch c.1947

After graduating in 1942, Belevitch joined the Bell Telephone Manufacturing Company (BTMC) in Antwerp, originally part of the International Bell Telephone Company headquartered in Brussels but, along with their other European holdings, sold to International Telephone and Telegraph (ITT) in 1925. At BTMC Belevitch became head of the transmission department. It was here that he came into contact with Wilhelm Cauer who became a great influence on him. Cauer was one of the leading circuit theorists of the day and at the time worked for Mix & Genest in Berlin, a sister company under the ITT umbrella. Cauer died during the Second World War but Belevitch long after continued to consider his works to be the highest authority on matters of circuit theory.

From 1951 Belevitch was involved in the design of electronic computers which BTMC were developing for the Belgian government. The purpose of this program was to "catch up" with the advances made in the English-speaking world during the war. It resulted in the construction of the Machine mathématique IRSIA-FNRS. (Note: IRSIA-FRNS: named after the two Belgian government departments sponsoring the project. IRSIA: Institut pour l’Encouragement de la Recherche Scientifique dans l’Industrie et dans l’Agriculture (Institute for Promotion of Scientific Research in Industry and Agriculture) FNRS: Fonds National de la Recherche Scientifique (National Fund for Scientific Research)) From 1952 Belevitch represented the electrical engineering aspect of this project. In 1955 Belevitch became director of the Belgian Computing Centre (Comité d'Étude et d'Exploitation des Calculateurs Électroniques) in Brussels which operated this computer for the government. Initially, only the 17-rack prototype was operational. One of the first tasks to which it was put was the calculation of Bessel functions. The full 34-rack machine was moved from Antwerp and put into service in 1957. Belevitch used this machine to investigate transcendental functions.

In 1963 Belevitch became head of the newly formed Laboratoire de Recherche MBLE (Note: MBLE: Manufacture Belge de Lampes Electriques, a company originally selling light bulbs under the Mazda brand, later entirely absorbed into Philips. See MBLE on French or Dutch Wikipedia.) (later Philips Research Laboratories Belgium) under the Philips director of research Hendrik Casimir in Eindhoven. This facility specialised in applied mathematics for Philips and was heavily involved in computing research. Belevitch stayed in this post until his retirement in November 1984.

Belevitch died on 26 December 1999. He is survived by a daughter, but not his wife.

== Works ==
Belevitch is best known for his contributions to circuit theory, particularly the mathematical basis of filters, modulators, coupled lines, and non-linear circuits. He was on the editorial board of the International Journal of Circuit Theory from its foundation in 1973. He also made major contributions in information theory, electronic computers, mathematics and linguistics.

Belevitch dominated international conferences and was prone to asking searching questions of the presenters of papers, often causing them some discomfort. The organiser of one conference at Birmingham University in 1959 made Belevitch the chairman of the session in which the organiser gave his own presentation. It seems he did this to restrain Belevitch from asking questions. Belevitch stopped attending conferences in the mid-1970s with the exception of the IEEE International Symposium on Circuits and Systems in Montreal in 1984 in order to receive the IEEE Centennial Medal.

=== Circuit theory ===
==== Scattering matrix ====
It was in his 1945 dissertation that Belevitch first introduced the important idea of the scattering matrix (Note: It is now recognised that the S-parameters used in circuit theory are in all essentials comparable with the scattering matrices used by physicists in scattering theory to describe the scattering behaviour of particles and waves. The "S" in S-parameter stands for scattering in recognition of this.) (called repartition matrix by Belevitch). This work was reproduced in part in a later paper by Belevitch, Transmission Losses in 2n-terminal Networks. Belgium was occupied by Nazi Germany for most of World War II and this prevented Belevitch from any communication with American colleagues. It was only after the war that it was discovered that the same idea, under the scattering matrix name, had independently been used by American scientists developing military radars. The American work by Montgomery, Dicke and Purcell was published in 1948. Belevitch in his work had applied scattering matrices to lumped-element circuits and was certainly the first to do so, whereas the Americans were concerned with the distributed-element circuits used at microwave frequencies in radar.

Belevitch produced a textbook, Classical Network Theory, first published in 1968 which comprehensively covered the field of passive one-port, and multiport circuits. In this work he made extensive use of the now-established S parameters from the scattering matrix concept, thus succeeding in welding the field into a coherent whole. The eponymous Belevitch's theorem, explained in this book, provides a method of determining whether or not it is possible to construct a passive, lossless circuit from discrete elements (that is, a circuit consisting only of inductors and capacitors) that represents a given scattering matrix.

==== Telephone conferencing ====
Belevitch's implementation of a 6-port conference matrix

Belevitch introduced the mathematical concept of conference matrices in 1950, so called because they originally arose in connection with a problem Belevitch was working on concerning telephone conferencing. However, they have applications in a range of other fields as well as being of interest to pure mathematics. Belevitch was studying setting up telephone conferencing by connecting together ideal transformers. It turns out that a necessary condition for setting up a conference with n telephone ports and ideal signal loss is the existence of an n×n conference matrix. Ideal signal loss means the loss is only that due to splitting the signal between conference subscribers – there is no dissipation within the conference network.

The existence of conference matrices is not a trivial question; they do not exist for all values of n. Values of n for which they exist are always of the form 4k+2 (k integer) but this is not, by itself, a sufficient condition. Conference matrices exist for n of 2, 6, 10, 14, 18, 26, 30, 38 and 42. They do not exist for n of 22 or 34. Belevitch obtained complete solutions for all n up to 38 and also noted that n=66 had multiple solutions.

==== Other work on circuits ====
Belevitch wrote a comprehensive summary of the history of circuit theory. He also had an interest in transmission lines, and published several papers on the subject. They include papers on skin effects and coupling between lines ("crosstalk") due to asymmetry.

Belevitch first introduced the great factorization theorem in which he gives a factorization of paraunitary matrices. Paraunitary matrices occur in the construction of filter banks used in multirate digital systems. Apparently, Belevitch's work is obscure and difficult to understand. A much more frequently cited version of this theorem was later published by P. P. Vaidyanathan.

=== Linguistics ===
Belevitch was educated in French but continued to speak Russian to his mother until she died. In fact, he was able to speak many languages, and could read even more. He studied Sanskrit and the etymology of Indo-European languages.

Belevitch wrote a book on human and machine languages in which he explored the idea of applying the mathematics of information theory to obtain results regarding human languages. The book highlighted the difficulties for machine understanding of language for which there was some naive enthusiasm amongst cybernetics researchers in the 1950s.

Belevitch also wrote a paper, On the Statistical Laws of Linguistic Distribution, which gives a derivation for the well-known empirical relationship, Zipf's law. This law, and the more complex Mandelbrot law, provide a relationship between the frequency of word occurrence in languages and the word's rank. In the simplest form of Zipf's law, frequency is inversely proportional to rank. Belevitch expressed a large class of statistical distributions (not only the normal distribution) in terms of rank and then expanded each expression into a Taylor series. In every case Belevitch obtained the remarkable result that a first order truncation of the series resulted in Zipf's law. Further, a second-order truncation of the Taylor series resulted in Mandelbrot's law. This gives some insight into the reason why Zipf's law has been found experimentally to hold in such a wide variety of languages.

=== Control systems ===
Belevitch played a part in developing a mathematical test for determining the controllability of linear control systems. A system is controllable if it can be moved from one state to another through the system state space in a finite time by application of control inputs. This test is known as the Popov-Belevitch-Hautus, or PBH, test. There is also a PBH test for determining the observability of a system – that is, the ability to determine the state of a system in finite time solely from the system's own outputs.

The PBH test was originally discovered by Elmer G. Gilbert in 1963, but Gilbert's version only applied to systems that could be represented by a diagonalizable matrix. The test was subsequently generalised by Vasile M. Popov (in 1966), Belevitch (in Classical Network Theory, 1968) and Malo Hautus in 1969.

== IEEE and honours ==
Belevitch was a Fellow of the Institute of Electrical and Electronics Engineers (IEEE) and was vice-chair of the Benelux section when it was formed in 1959. He was awarded the IEEE Centennial Medal, and in 1993, the Society Award (now called Mac Van Valkenburg Award) of the IEEE Circuits and Systems Society. He was also a member of the North Rhine-Westphalian Academy of Sciences.

Belevitch received an honorary doctoral degree in 1975 from the Technical University of Munich, and another from the École Polytechnique Fédérale de Lausanne, Switzerland, in 1978. He was also rewarded with Belgian royal medals.

Since 2003, the IEEE Circuits and Systems Society has instituted a Vitold Belevitch award for work in circuit theory. The award is presented biennially at the European Conference on Circuit Theory & Design.

== Selected publications ==
Belevitch was a prolific publisher with around 4000 pages of scientific output. He was publishing throughout his career right up to, and beyond, his retirement in 1984.

=== Books ===
- Langage des Machines et Langage Humain, Bruxelles: Office de publicité, 1956 OCLC 8998282 (in French).
- Théorie des Circuits de Télécommunication, Louvain: Librairie Universitaire, 1957 OCLC 3531476 (in French).
- Théorie des Circuits Nonlinéaires en Régime Alternatif: Redresseurs, Modulateurs, Oscillateurs, Louvain: Uystpruyst, 1959 OCLC 637334683 (in French).
- Classical Network Theory, San Francisco: Holden-Day, 1968 OCLC 413916.

=== Journal articles ===
- "Extension of Norton's method of impedance transformation to band-pass filters", Electrical Communication, vol.24, no.1, pp. 59–65, March 1947.
- "Insertion loss and effective phase shift in composite filters at cut-off frequencies", Electrical Communication, vol.24, no.2, pp. 192–194, June 1947.
- "Transmission losses in 2n-terminal networks", Journal of Applied Physics, vol.19, No. 7, pp. 636–638, 1948.
- "Development in the design of filters", Electrical Communication, vol.26, no.1, pp. 84–98, March 1949.
- "Theory of 2n-terminal networks with application to conference telephony", Electrical Communication, vol.27, no.3, pp. 231–244, September 1950.
- "Topics in the design of insertion loss filters", IRE Transactions on Circuit Theory, vol.2, iss.4, pp. 337–346, December 1955.
- "Théorie de l'information et statistique linguistique", Académie Royale de Belgique: Bulletin de la Classe des Sciences, series 5, vol.42, pp. 419–436, 1956. (in French)
- "On the statistical laws of linguistic distribution", Annales de la Société Scientifique de Bruxelles, vol.3, iss.73, pp. 310–326, 1959 ISSN 0037-959X. (in French)
- "Summary of the history of circuit theory", Proceedings of the IRE, vol.50, iss.5, pp. 848–855, May 1962.
- "Factorization of scattering matrices with applications to passive network synthesis", Philips Research Reports, vol.18, pp. 275–317, 1963 ISSN 0031-7918.
- "Interpolation matrices", Philips Research Reports, vol.25, pp. 337–369, 1970 ISSN 0031-7918.
- "On the realizability of non-rational positive real functions", International Journal of Circuit Theory and Applications, vol.1, iss.1, pp. 17–30, March 1973. doi:10.1002/cta.4490010105
- "Theory of the proximity effect in multiwire cables", Philips Research Reports, vol.32, pp. 16–43, 96-177, 1977 ISSN 0031-7918.
- "The Gauss hypergeometric ratio as a positive real function", SIAM Journal on Mathematical Analysis, vol.13, pp. 1024–1040, 1982.
- "Ideal rectifier n-ports are solvable", International Journal of Circuit Theory and Applications, vol.15, iss.2, pp. 171–180, April 1987. doi:10.1002/cta.4490150206

== Bibliography ==
- Belevitch, Vitold "Summary of the history of circuit theory", Proceedings of the IRE, vol.50, iss.5, pp. 848–855, May 1962.
- Chen, Ben M.; Lin, Zongli; Shamash, Yacov Linear Systems Theory: a Structural Decomposition Approach, Boston: Birkhäuser, 2004 ISBN 0-8176-3779-6.
- Colbourn, Charles J.; Dinitz, Jeffrey H. Handbook of Combinatorial Designs, Boca Raton, Florida: Chapman and Hall/CRC Press, 2007 ISBN 1-58488-506-8.
- Dutoit, Thierry (ed) "Vitold Belevitch (2 March 1921 - 26 December 1999)", Théorie des Circuits et Traitement du Signal Lab, accessed and archived 21 May 2011.
- Fettweis, Alfred "In memoriam, Vitold Belevitch", IEEE Transactions on Circuits and Systems, vol.47, iss.5, pp. 613–614, May 2000.
- Fettweis, Alfred (in Dutoit) "Reminiscing Vitold Belevitch (1921–1999)", European Conference on Circuit Theory and Design 2001, Plenary session, Helsinki.
- Huurdeman, Anton A. The Worldwide History of Telecommunications, New Jersey: Wiley-IEEE, 2003 ISBN 0-471-20505-2.
- Kisačanin, Branislav; Agarwal, Gyan C. Linear Control Systems, New York: Kluwer Academic/Plenum Publishers, 2002 ISBN 0-306-46743-7.
- van Lint, Jacobus Hendricus; Wilson, Richard Michael A Course in Combinatorics, Cambridge: Cambridge University Press, 2001 ISBN 0-521-00601-5.
- Mols, Sandra; d'Udekem-Gevers, Marie "Disseminating electronics: Bell Telephone and the emergence of electronic computing expertise in post-war Belgium, c.1945–c.1960", History of Telecommunications Conference, 2008, pp. 102–109 Paris: 11–12 September 2008 ISBN 978-1-4244-2530-3.
- Montgomery, Carol Gray; Dicke, Robert Henry; Purcell, Edward M. Principles of microwave circuits, London: Peter Peregrinus Ltd., 1987 ISBN 0-86341-100-2 (1948 edition is New York: McGraw-Hill, OCLC 2205224).
- Rockmore, Daniel Nahum; Healy, Dennis M. Modern Signal Processing, Cambridge: Cambridge University Press, 2004 ISBN 0-521-82706-X.
- Strang, Gilbert; Nguyen, Truong Wavelets and Filter Banks, Wellesley, MA: Wellesley-Cambridge Press 1996 ISBN 0-9614088-7-1.
- Stinson, Douglas Robert Combinatorial Designs: Constructions and Analysis, New York: Springer, 2004 ISBN 0-387-95487-2.
- Valkenburg, Mac Elwyn Van Circuit Theory: Foundations and Classical Contributions, Stroudsburg, Pennsylvania: Dowden, Hutchinson & Ross, 1974 ISBN 0-87933-084-8.
- Vaidyanathan, P. P. Multirate systems and filter banks, Englewood Cliffs, NJ: PTR Prentice Hall, 1993 ISBN 0-13-605718-7.
- Vandewalle, Joos "In memoriam – Vitold Belevitch", International Journal of Circuit Theory and Applications, vol.28, iss.5, pp. 429–430, September/October 2000. doi:10.1002/1097-007X(200009/10)28:5<429::AID-CTA121>3.0.CO;2-6
- de Vries, Marc; Boersma, Kees 80 years of research at the Philips Natuurkundig Laboratorium (1914-1994), Amsterdam University Press, 2005 ISBN 90-8555-051-3.
- Walker, Mark Science and Ideology: a Comparative History, Routledge, 2003 ISBN 0-415-27122-3.
