= Cap set =

Points with no three in a line

The 9 points and 12 lines of $\mathbb{Z}_3^2$, and a 4-element cap set (the four yellow points) in this space

In affine geometry, a cap set is a subset of the affine space $\mathbb{Z}_3^n$ (the $n$-dimensional affine space over the three-element field) where no three elements sum to the zero vector. The cap set problem is the problem of finding the size of the largest possible cap set, as a function of $n$. The first few cap set sizes are 1, 2, 4, 9, 20, 45, 112, ... (sequence A090245 in the OEIS).

Caps are defined more generally as subsets of a finite affine or projective space with no three in a line.

The "cap set" terminology should be distinguished from other unrelated mathematical objects with the same name, and in particular from sets with the compact absorption property in function spaces as well as from compact convex co-convex subsets of a convex set.

== Example ==
A complete set of 81 cards isomorphic with those of the game Set showing all possible combinations of the four features. Considering each 3×3 group as a plane aligned in 4-dimensional space, a set comprises 3 cards in a (4-dimensional) row, with wrap-around. An example 20-card cap set is shaded yellow.

An example of cap sets comes from the card game Set, a card game in which each card has four features (its number, symbol, shading, and color), each of which can take one of three values. The cards of this game can be interpreted as representing points of the four-dimensional affine space $\mathbb{Z}_3^4$, where each coordinate of a point specifies the value of one of the features. A line, in this space, is a triple of cards that, in each feature, are either all the same as each other or all different from each other. The game play consists of finding and collecting lines among the cards that are currently face up, and a cap set describes an array of face-up cards in which no lines may be collected.

One way to construct a large cap set in the game Set would be to choose two out of the three values for each feature, and place face up each of the cards that uses only one of those two values in each of its features. The result would be a cap set of 16 cards. More generally, the same strategy would lead to cap sets in $\mathbb{Z}_3^n$ of size $2^n$. However, in 1970, Giuseppe Pellegrino proved that four-dimensional cap sets have maximum size 20. In terms of Set, this result means that some layouts of 20 cards have no line to be collected, but that every layout of 21 cards has at least one line. (The dates are not a typo: the Pellegrino cap set result from 1970 really does predate the first publication of the Set game in 1974.)

== Maximum size ==
Since the work of Pellegrino in 1971, and of Tom Brown and Joe Buhler, who in 1984 proved that cap-sets cannot constitute any constant proportion of the whole space, there has been a significant line of research on how large they may be.

=== Lower bounds ===
Pellegrino's solution for the four-dimensional cap-set problem also leads to larger lower bounds than $2^n$ for any higher dimension, which was further improved to $2.2173^{n}$ by Edel (2004) and then to $2.2180^{n}$ by Tyrrell (2022). In December 2023, a team of researchers from Google's DeepMind published a paper where they paired a large language model (LLM) with an evaluator and managed to improve the bound to $2.2202^{n}$. The bound was subsequently improved to $2.2203^n$ with another large language model and to $(2.2203 + \varepsilon)^n$ by Hametner & Tyrrell (2026).

=== Upper bounds ===
In 1984, Tom Brown and Joe Buhler proved that the largest possible size of a cap set in $\mathbb{Z}_3^n$ is $o(3^n)$ as $n$ grows; loosely speaking, this means that cap sets have zero density. Péter Frankl, Ronald Graham, and Vojtěch Rödl have shown in 1987 that the result of Brown and Buhler follows easily from the Ruzsa–Szemerédi triangle removal lemma, and asked whether there exists a constant $c<3$ such that, indeed, for all sufficiently large values of $n$, any cap set in $\mathbb{Z}_3^n$ has size at most $c^n$; that is, whether any set in $\mathbb{Z}_3^n$ of size exceeding $c^n$ contains an affine line. This question also appeared in a paper published by Noga Alon and Moshe Dubiner in 1995. In the same year, Roy Meshulam proved that the size of a cap set does not exceed $2\cdot3^n/n$. Michael Bateman and Nets Katz improved the bound to $O(3^n/n^{1+\varepsilon})$ with a positive constant $\varepsilon$.

Determining whether Meshulam's bound can be improved to $c^n$ with $c<3$ was considered one of the most intriguing open problems in additive combinatorics and Ramsey theory for over 20 years, highlighted, for instance, by blog posts on this problem from Fields medalists Timothy Gowers and Terence Tao. In his blog post, Tao refers to it as "perhaps, my favorite open problem" and gives a simplified proof of the exponential bound on cap sets, namely that for any prime power $p$, a subset $S \subset F_p^n$ that contains no arithmetic progression of length $3$ has size at most $c_p^n$ for some $c_p<p$.

The cap set conjecture was solved in 2016 due to a series of breakthroughs in the polynomial method. Ernie Croot, Vsevolod Lev, and Péter Pál Pach posted a preprint on the related problem of progression-free subsets of $\mathbb{Z}_4^n$, and the method was used by Jordan Ellenberg and Dion Gijswijt to prove an upper bound of $2.756^n$ on the cap set problem. In 2019, Sander Dahmen, Johannes Hölzl and Rob Lewis formalised the proof of this upper bound in the Lean theorem prover.

As of March 2023, there is no exponential improvement to Ellenberg and Gijswijt's upper bound. Jiang showed that by precisely examining the multinomial coefficients that come out of Ellenberg and Gijswijt's proof, one can gain a factor of ${\sqrt{n}}$. This saving occurs for the same reasons that there is a ${1/\sqrt{n}}$ factor in the central binomial coefficient.

== Mutually disjoint cap sets ==
In 2013, five researchers together published an analysis of all the ways in which spaces of up to the size of $\mathbb{Z}_3^4$ can be partitioned into disjoint cap sets. They reported that it is possible to use four different cap sets of size 20 in $\mathbb{Z}_3^4$ that between them cover 80 different cells; the single cell left uncovered is called the anchor of each of the four cap sets, the single point that when added to the 20 points of a cap set makes the entire sum go to 0 (mod 3). All cap sets in such a disjoint collection share the same anchor. Results for larger sizes are still open as of 2021.

== Applications ==
=== Sunflower conjecture ===
The solution to the cap set problem can also be used to prove a partial form of the sunflower conjecture, namely that if a family of subsets of an $n$-element set has no three subsets whose pairwise intersections are all equal, then the number of subsets in the family is at most $c^n$ for a constant $c<2$.

=== Matrix multiplication algorithms ===
The upper bounds on cap sets imply lower bounds on certain types of algorithms for matrix multiplication.

=== Strongly regular graphs ===
The Games graph is a strongly regular graph with 729 vertices. Every edge belongs to a unique triangle, so it is a locally linear graph, the largest known locally linear strongly regular graph. Its construction is based on the unique 56-point cap set in the five-dimensional ternary projective space (rather than the affine space that cap-sets are commonly defined in).

== See also ==
- No-three-in-line problem, a problem of avoiding three elements in a line in a two-dimensional grid
- Ruzsa–Szemerédi problem
