= Aneesur Rahman =

Indian physicist

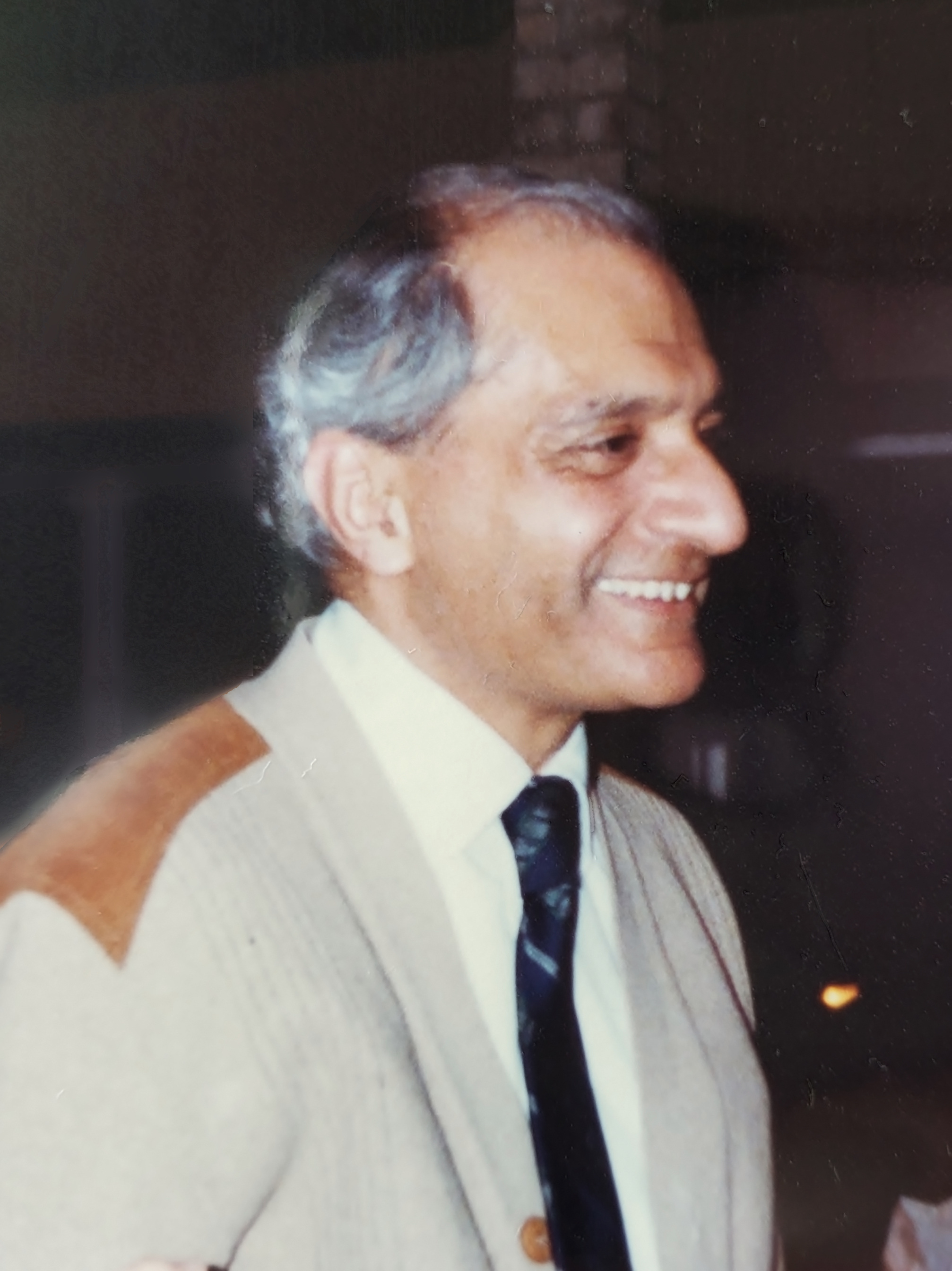
- Born: 24 August 1927; Hyderabad, British India
- Died: 6 June 1987 (aged 59); Minneapolis, Minnesota
- Education: Cambridge, Louvain
- Known for: Molecular dynamics
- Awards: Irving Langmuir Award (1977)
- Scientific career
- Doctoral advisor: Charles Lambert Manneback

Aneesur Rahman (24 August 1927 – 6 June 1987) was an Indian-born American physicist who pioneered the application of computational methods to physical systems.

== Education and career ==
Rahman was born on 24 August 1927 in Hyderabad, India. He earned a bachelor's degree in Hyderabad, and went on to Cambridge University in England, where he completed the tripos program in physics and in mathematics. He then completed his PhD in theoretical physics at the University of Louvain, Belgium, in 1953. His supervisor was Charles Lambert Manneback.

Following the PhD, Rahman worked for four years in Osmania University in Hyderabad. At the end of 1957, he moved to Mumbai, where he worked at the Tata Institute of Fundamental Research.

In 1960, Rahman began a 25-year tenure as a physicist at Argonne National Laboratory outside Chicago. In 1985, Rahman joined the faculty at the University of Minnesota as a professor of physics and fellow at the Supercomputer Institute.

Rahman died on 6 June 1987 in Minneapolis.

== Research ==
Rahman has been called the father of molecular dynamics, an approach used in many areas of science that utilizes computers to simulate the microscopic behavior of systems including how they evolve with time and a range of their properties. His 1964 paper on liquid argon studied a system of 864 argon atoms on a CDC 3600 computer, using a Lennard-Jones potential.

His algorithms still form the basis for many codes written today.

== Awards and honours ==
In 1977, Rahman was awarded the Irving Langmuir Prize by the American Physical Society. A conference was held in his honor in 1984, on the occasion of his 60th birthday and of the 20th anniversary of his paper simulating argon atoms; a festschrift was published in the Journal of Physical Chemistry.

A meeting in memory of Rahman was held in September 1987 at the Centre Européen de Calcul Atomique et Moléculaire in 1987.

The American Physical Society annually awards the Aneesur Rahman Prize for outstanding achievement in computational research. First awarded in 1993, the Aneesur Rahman Prize is the highest honour in the field of computational physics given by the American Physical Society.

Argonne National Laboratory offered a named fellowship postdoctoral position honoring Rahman. The School of Physics at the University of Minnesota has an annual Rahman Award of $1,000 prize to advanced graduate students for outstanding research contributions.
