= Cyclic graph =

In mathematics, a cyclic graph may mean a graph that contains a cycle, or a graph that is a cycle, with varying definitions of cycles. See:

- Cycle (graph theory), a cycle in a graph
- Forest (graph theory), an undirected graph with no cycles
- Biconnected graph, an undirected graph in which every edge belongs to a cycle
- Directed acyclic graph, a directed graph with no cycles
- Strongly connected graph, a directed graph in which every edge belongs to a cycle
- Aperiodic graph, a directed graph in which the cycle lengths have no nontrivial common divisor
- Pseudoforest, a directed or undirected graph in which every connected component includes at most one cycle
- Cycle graph, a graph that has the structure of a single cycle
- Pancyclic graph, a graph that has cycles of all possible lengths
- Cycle detection (graph theory), the algorithmic problem of finding cycles in graphs

Other similarly-named concepts include

- Cycle graph (algebra), a graph that illustrates the cyclic subgroups of a group
- Circulant graph, a graph with an automorphism which permutes its vertices cyclically.
