= Belevitch's theorem =

Belevitch's theorem is a theorem in electrical network analysis due to the Russo-Belgian mathematician Vitold Belevitch (1921–1999). The theorem provides a test for a given S-matrix to determine whether or not it can be constructed as a lossless rational two-port network.

Lossless implies that the network contains only inductances and capacitances – no resistances. Rational (meaning the driving point impedance Z(p) is a rational function of p) implies that the network consists solely of discrete elements (inductors and capacitors only – no distributed elements).

== The theorem ==
For a given S-matrix $\mathbf S(p)$ of degree $d$;

$$\mathbf S(p) = \begin{bmatrix} s_{11} & s_{12} \\ s_{21} & s_{22} \end{bmatrix}$$
where,
p is the complex frequency variable and may be replaced by $i \omega$ in the case of steady state sine wave signals, that is, where only a Fourier analysis is required
d will equate to the number of elements (inductors and capacitors) in the network, if such network exists.

Belevitch's theorem states that, $\scriptstyle \mathbf S(p)$ represents a lossless rational network if and only if,

$$\mathbf  S(p) = \frac {1}{g(p)} \begin{bmatrix} h(p) & f(p) \\ \pm f(-p) & \mp h(-p) \end{bmatrix}$$
where,
$f(p)$, $g(p)$ and $h(p)$ are real polynomials
$g(p)$ is a strict Hurwitz polynomial of degree not exceeding $d$
$g(p)g(-p) = f(p)f(-p) + h(p)h(-p)$ for all $\scriptstyle p \, \in \, \mathbb C$.

== Bibliography ==
- Belevitch, Vitold Classical Network Theory, San Francisco: Holden-Day, 1968 OCLC 413916.
- Rockmore, Daniel Nahum; Healy, Dennis M. Modern Signal Processing, Cambridge: Cambridge University Press, 2004 ISBN 0-521-82706-X.
