= Charles Lambert Manneback =

Belgian physicist

Charles Lambert Marie Joseph Manneback
- Born: 6 March 1894; Etterbeek, Belgium
- Died: 15 December 1975 (aged 81); Etterbeek, Belgium
- Education: Catholic University of Leuven; Massachusetts Institute of Technology
- Scientific career
- Fields: Physics, Mining, Mathematics
- Workplaces: MIT; CU Leuven
- Thesis: An Integral Equation for Skin-Effect in Parallel Conductors (1922)
- Doctoral advisor: Vannevar Bush
- Doctoral students: Vitold Belevitch; Aneesur Rahman

Charles Lambert Marie Joseph Manneback (born 9 March 1894 in Etterbeek, Belgium; died 15 December 1975 in Etterbeek) was a Belgian physicist, mining engineer, and mathematician.

After serving in the Belgian army during World War I, he obtained a civil engineering diploma from the Catholic University of Leuven in 1920.

He then left to the United States as an exchange fellow, where he obtained an M.A. degree from the Massachusetts Institute of Technology, and in 1922 a Ph.D. degree in electrical engineering. His dissertation was advised by Vannevar Bush and had a subject from the theory of electromagnetic waves and the skin effect.

He was a professor at the Catholic University of Leuven, and a member of the Royal Academies for Science and the Arts of Belgium.
