= Littlewood–Paley theory =

Theoretical framework in harmonic analysis

In harmonic analysis, a field within mathematics, Littlewood–Paley theory is a theoretical framework used to extend certain results about square-integrable L^{2} functions to L^{p} functions for 1 < p < ∞. It is typically used as a substitute for orthogonality arguments which only apply to L^{p} functions when p = 2. One implementation involves studying a function by decomposing it in terms of functions with localized frequencies, and using the Littlewood–Paley g-function to compare it with its Poisson integral. The 1-variable case was originated by J. E. Littlewood and R. Paley (1931, 1937, 1938) and developed further by Polish mathematicians A. Zygmund and J. Marcinkiewicz in the 1930s using complex function theory (Zygmund 2002, chapters XIV, XV). E. M. Stein later extended the theory to higher dimensions using real variable techniques.

== The dyadic decomposition of a function ==
Littlewood–Paley theory uses a decomposition of a function f into a sum of functions f_{ρ} with localized frequencies. There are several ways to construct such a decomposition; a typical method is as follows.

If f(x) is a function on R, and ρ is a measurable set (in the frequency space) with characteristic function $\chi_\rho(\xi)$, then f_{ρ} is defined via its Fourier transform

$$\hat f_\rho := \chi_\rho\hat f$$.

Informally, f_{ρ} is the piece of f whose frequencies lie in ρ.

If Δ is a collection of measurable sets which (up to measure 0) are disjoint and have union on the real line, then a well behaved function f can be written as a sum of functions f_{ρ} for ρ ∈ Δ.

When Δ consists of the sets of the form

$$\rho = [-2^{k+1},-2^k] \cup [2^k,2^{k+1}].$$

for k an integer, this gives a so-called "dyadic decomposition" of f : Σ_{ρ} f_{ρ}.

There are many variations of this construction; for example, the characteristic function of a set used in the definition of f_{ρ} can be replaced by a smoother function.

A key estimate of Littlewood–Paley theory is the Littlewood–Paley theorem, which bounds the size of the functions f_{ρ} in terms of the size of f. There are many versions of this theorem corresponding to the different ways of decomposing f. A typical estimate is to bound the L^{p} norm of (Σ_{ρ} |f_{ρ}|^{2})^{1/2} by a multiple of the L^{p} norm of f.

In higher dimensions it is possible to generalize this construction by replacing intervals with rectangles with sides parallel to the coordinate axes. Unfortunately these are rather special sets, which limits the applications to higher dimensions.

== The Littlewood–Paley g function ==
The g function is a non-linear operator on L^{p}(R^{n}) that can be used to control the L^{p} norm of a function f in terms of its Poisson integral. The Poisson integral u(x,y) of f is defined for y > 0 by

$$u(x,y) = \int_{\mathbb R^n} P_y(t)f(x-t) \, dt$$

where the Poisson kernel P on the upper half space $\{ (y;x)\in\mathbf{R}^{n+1} \mid y>0\}$ is given by

$$P_y(x) = \int_{\mathbb R^n} e^{-2\pi i t \cdot x - 2\pi |t|y} \, dt = \frac{\Gamma((n+1)/2)}{\pi^{(n+1)/2}}\frac{y}{(|x|^2+y^2)^{(n+1)/2}}.$$

The Littlewood–Paley g function g(f) is defined by

$$g(f)(x) = \left(\int_0^\infty|\nabla u(x,y)|^2y \, dy\right)^{1/2}$$

A basic property of g is that it approximately preserves norms. More precisely, for 1 < p < ∞, the ratio of the L^{p} norms of f and g(f) is bounded above and below by fixed positive constants depending on n and p but not on f.

== Applications ==
One early application of Littlewood–Paley theory was the proof that if S_{n} are the partial sums of the Fourier series of a periodic L^{p} function (p > 1) and n_{j} is a sequence satisfying n_{j+1}/n_{j} > q for some fixed q > 1, then the sequence S_{n_{j}} converges almost everywhere. This was later superseded by the Carleson–Hunt theorem showing that S_{n} itself converges almost everywhere.

Littlewood–Paley theory can also be used to prove the Marcinkiewicz multiplier theorem.
