= Paley–Zygmund inequality =

Probability equation in mathematics

In mathematics, the Paley–Zygmund inequality bounds the probability that a positive random variable is small, in terms of its first two moments. The inequality was proved by Raymond Paley and Antoni Zygmund.

Theorem: If Z ≥ 0 is a random variable with finite variance, and if $0 \le \theta \le 1$, then

$$\operatorname{P}( Z > \theta\operatorname{E}[Z] )
\ge (1-\theta)^2 \frac{\operatorname{E}[Z]^2}{\operatorname{E}[Z^2]}.$$

Proof: First,

$$\operatorname{E}[Z] = \operatorname{E}[ Z \, \mathbf{1}_{\{ Z \le \theta \operatorname{E}[Z] \}}]  + \operatorname{E}[ Z \, \mathbf{1}_{\{ Z > \theta \operatorname{E}[Z] \}} ].$$

The first addend is at most $\theta \operatorname{E}[Z]$, while the second is at most $\operatorname{E}[Z^2]^{1/2} \operatorname{P}( Z > \theta\operatorname{E}[Z])^{1/2}$ by the Cauchy–Schwarz inequality. The desired inequality then follows. ∎

== Related inequalities ==
The Paley–Zygmund inequality can be written as

$$\operatorname{P}( Z > \theta \operatorname{E}[Z] )
\ge \frac{(1-\theta)^2 \, \operatorname{E}[Z]^2}{\operatorname{Var} Z + \operatorname{E}[Z]^2}.$$

This can be improved since, by the Cauchy–Schwarz inequality,

$$\operatorname{E}[Z - \theta \operatorname{E}[Z]]
\le \operatorname{E}[ (Z - \theta \operatorname{E}[Z]) \mathbf{1}_{\{ Z > \theta \operatorname{E}[Z] \}} ]
\le \operatorname{E}[ (Z - \theta \operatorname{E}[Z])^2 ]^{1/2} \operatorname{P}( Z > \theta \operatorname{E}[Z] )^{1/2}$$

which, after rearranging, implies that

$$\operatorname{P}(Z > \theta \operatorname{E}[Z])
\ge \frac{(1-\theta)^2 \operatorname{E}[Z]^2}{\operatorname{E}[( Z - \theta \operatorname{E}[Z] )^2]}
= \frac{(1-\theta)^2 \operatorname{E}[Z]^2}{\operatorname{Var} Z + (1-\theta)^2 \operatorname{E}[Z]^2}.$$

This inequality is sharp; equality is achieved if Z almost surely equals a positive constant.

In turn, this implies another convenient form (known as Cantelli's inequality) which is

$$\operatorname{P}(Z >  \mu - \theta \sigma)
\ge \frac{\theta^2}{1+\theta^2},$$

where $\mu=\operatorname{E}[Z]$ and $\sigma^2 = \operatorname{Var}[Z]$. This follows from the substitution $\theta = 1-\theta'\sigma/\mu$ valid when $0\le \mu - \theta \sigma\le\mu$.

A strengthened form of the Paley-Zygmund inequality states that if Z is a non-negative random variable then

$$\operatorname{P}( Z > \theta \operatorname{E}[Z \mid Z > 0] )
\ge \frac{(1-\theta)^2 \, \operatorname{E}[Z]^2}{\operatorname{E}[Z^2]}$$

for every $0 \leq \theta \leq 1$. This inequality follows by applying the usual Paley-Zygmund inequality to the conditional distribution of Z given that it is positive and noting that the various factors of $\operatorname{P}(Z>0)$ cancel.

Both this inequality and the usual Paley-Zygmund inequality also admit $L^p$ versions: If Z is a non-negative random variable and $p > 1$ then

$$\operatorname{P}( Z > \theta \operatorname{E}[Z \mid Z > 0] )
\ge \frac{(1-\theta)^{p/(p-1)} \, \operatorname{E}[Z]^{p/(p-1)}}{\operatorname{E}[Z^p]^{1/(p-1)}}.$$

for every $0 \leq \theta \leq 1$. This follows by the same proof as above but using Hölder's inequality in place of the Cauchy-Schwarz inequality.

== See also ==
- Cantelli's inequality
- Second moment method
- Concentration inequality – a summary of tail-bounds on random variables.
