= Raymond Paley =

English mathematician

Raymond E. A. C. Paley
- Born: 7 January 1907; Bournemouth, England
- Died: 7 April 1933 (aged 26); Deception Pass, Fossil Mountain, in the Canadian Rockies
- Education: University of Cambridge
- Known for: Littlewood–Paley theory; Paley construction; Paley graph; Paley–Wiener theorem; Paley–Zygmund inequality; Walsh–Paley numeration
- Awards: Smith's Prize (1930)
- Scientific career
- Fields: Mathematics

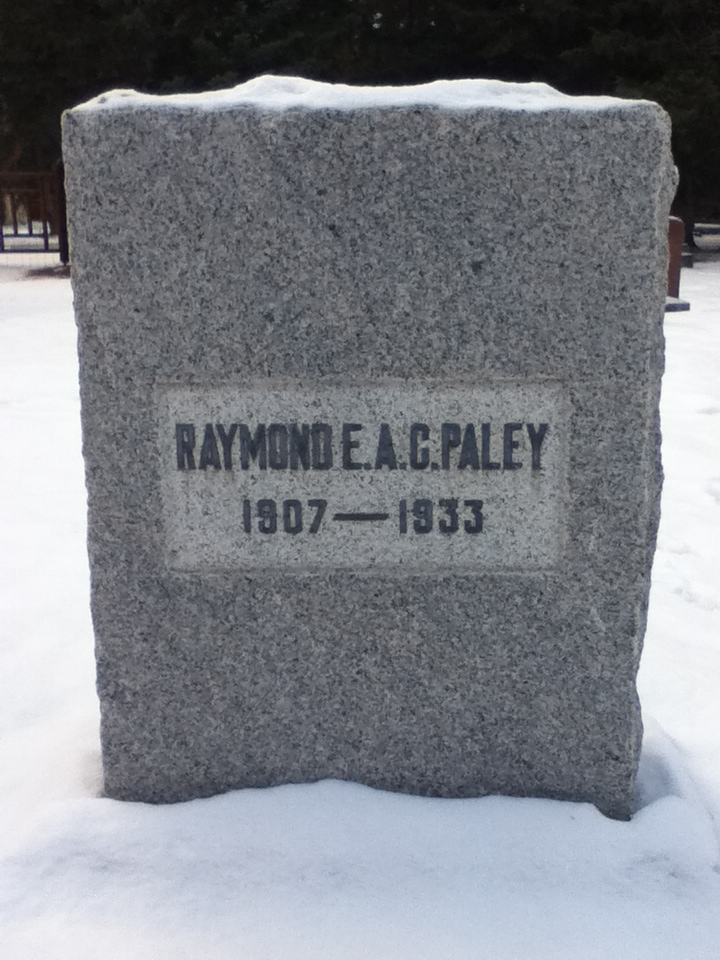
Photograph of Paley's grave in The Old Banff Cemetery. The main gate is visible on the left.

Raymond Edward Alan Christopher Paley (7 January 1907 – 7 April 1933) was an English mathematician who made significant contributions to mathematical analysis before dying young in a skiing accident.

== Life ==
Paley was born in Bournemouth, England, the son of an artillery officer who died of tuberculosis before Paley was born. He was educated at Eton College as a King's Scholar and at Trinity College, Cambridge. He became a wrangler in 1928, and with J. A. Todd, he was one of two winners of the 1930 Smith's Prize examination.

He was elected a Research Fellow of Trinity College in 1930, edging out Todd for the position, and continued at Cambridge as a postgraduate student, advised by John Edensor Littlewood. After the 1931 return of G. H. Hardy to Cambridge he participated in weekly joint seminars with the other students of Hardy and Littlewood. He traveled to the US in 1932 to work with Norbert Wiener at the Massachusetts Institute of Technology and with George Pólya at Princeton University, and as part of the same trip also planned to work with Lipót Fejér at a seminar in Chicago organized as part of the Century of Progress exposition.

He was killed on 7 April 1933 in a skiing trip to the Canadian Rockies, by an avalanche on Deception Pass.

Paley, born in 1907, was one of the greatest stars in pure mathematics in Britain, whose young genius frightened even Hardy. Had he lived, he might well have turned into another Littlewood: his 26 papers, written mostly in collaboration with Littlewood, Zygmund, Wiener and Ursell, opened new areas in analysis.

— Béla Bollobás, Littlewood's Miscellany, Foreword

== Contributions ==
Paley's contributions include the following.

- His mathematical research with Littlewood began in 1929, with his work towards a fellowship at Trinity, and Hardy writes that "Littlewood's influence dominates nearly all his earliest work". Their work became the foundation for Littlewood–Paley theory, an application of real-variable techniques in complex analysis.^{[a]}
- The Walsh–Paley numeration, a standard method for indexing the Walsh functions, came from a 1932 suggestion of Paley.^{[b]}
- Paley collaborated with Antoni Zygmund on Fourier series, continuing the work on this topic that he had already done with Littlewood. His work in this area also led to the Paley–Zygmund inequality in probability theory.^{[c]}
- In a 1933 paper, he published the Paley construction for Hadamard matrices.^{[d]} In the same paper, he first formulated the Hadamard conjecture on the sizes of matrices for which Hadamard matrices exist. The Paley graphs and Paley tournaments in graph theory are closely related, although they do not appear explicitly in this work. In the context of compressed sensing, frames (partial bases of Hilbert spaces) derived from this construction have been called "Paley equiangular tight frames".
- His collaboration with Norbert Wiener included the Paley–Wiener theorem in harmonic analysis. Paley was originally selected as the 1934 American Mathematical Society Colloquium Lecturer; after his death, Wiener replaced him as speaker, and spoke on their joint work, which was published as a book.^{[e]}

== Selected publications ==
For the short span of his research career, Paley was very productive; Hardy lists 26 of Paley's publications, and more were published posthumously. These publications include:

a.	Littlewood, J. E.; Paley, R. E. A. C. (1931), "Theorems on Fourier Series and Power Series", The Journal of the London Mathematical Society, 6 (3): 230–233, doi:10.1112/jlms/s1-6.3.230, MR 1574750; Littlewood, J. E.; Paley, R. E. A. C. (1936), "Theorems on Fourier series and power series (II)", Proceedings of the London Mathematical Society, Second Series, 42 (1): 52–89, doi:10.1112/plms/s2-42.1.52, MR 1577045; Littlewood, J. E.; Paley, R. E. A. C. (1937), "Theorems on Fourier Series and Power Series(III)", Proceedings of the London Mathematical Society, Second Series, 43 (2): 105–126, doi:10.1112/plms/s2-43.2.105, MR 1575588

b.	Paley, R. E. A. C. (1932), "A Remarkable Series of Orthogonal Functions I, II", Proceedings of the London Mathematical Society, Second Series, 34 (4): 241–264, 265–279, doi:10.1112/plms/s2-34.1.241, MR 1576148, Zbl 0005.24806

c.	Paley, R. E. A. C.; Zygmund, Antoni (1932), "A note on analytic functions in the unit circle", Proceedings of the Cambridge Philosophical Society, 28 (3): 266–272, Bibcode:1932PCPS...28..266P, doi:10.1017/S0305004100010112, Zbl 0005.06602

d.	Paley, R. E. A. C. (1933), "On orthogonal matrices", Journal of Mathematics and Physics, 12 (1–4), Massachusetts Institute of Technology: 311–320, doi:10.1002/sapm1933121311, Zbl 0007.10004

e.	Paley, Raymond E. A. C.; Wiener, Norbert (1934), Fourier Transforms in the Complex Domain, Colloquium Publications, vol. 19, Providence, Rhode Island: American Mathematical Society, Zbl 0011.01601
