= Locally linear graph =

Graph where every edge is in one triangle

The nine-vertex Paley graph is locally linear. Its six triangles are visible as equilateral triangles in this layout.

In graph theory, a locally linear graph is an undirected graph in which every edge belongs to exactly one triangle. Equivalently, for each vertex of the graph, its neighbors are each adjacent to exactly one other neighbor. That is, locally (from the point of view of any one vertex) the rest of the graph looks like a perfect matching. Locally linear graphs have also been called locally matched graphs. More technically, the triangles of any locally linear graph form the hyperedges of a triangle-free 3-uniform linear hypergraph, and they form the blocks of certain partial Steiner triple systems; and the locally linear graphs are exactly the Gaifman graphs of these hypergraphs or partial Steiner systems.

Many constructions for locally linear graphs are known. Examples of locally linear graphs include the triangular cactus graphs, the line graphs of 3-regular triangle-free graphs, and the Cartesian products of smaller locally linear graphs. Certain Kneser graphs, and certain strongly regular graphs, are also locally linear.

The question of how many edges locally linear graphs can have is one of the formulations of the Ruzsa–Szemerédi problem. Although dense graphs can have a number of edges proportional to the square of the number of vertices, locally linear graphs have a smaller number of edges, falling short of the square by at least a small non-constant factor. The densest planar graphs that can be locally linear are also known. The least dense locally linear graphs are the triangular cactus graphs.

== Constructions ==
=== Gluing and products ===
Friendship graphs

The friendship graphs, graphs formed by gluing together a collection of triangles at a single shared vertex, are locally linear. They are the only finite graphs having the stronger property that every pair of vertices (adjacent or not) share exactly one common neighbor. More generally every triangular cactus graph, a graph formed by gluing triangles at shared vertices without forming any additional cycles, is locally linear.

Locally linear graphs may be formed from smaller locally linear graphs by the following operation, a form of the clique-sum operation on graphs. Let $G$ and $H$ be any two locally linear graphs, select a triangle from each of them, and glue the two graphs by merging together corresponding pairs of vertices in the two selected triangles. Then the resulting graph remains locally linear.

The Cartesian product of any two locally linear graphs remains locally linear, because any triangles in the product come from triangles in one or the other factors. For instance, the nine-vertex Paley graph (the graph of the 3-3 duoprism) is the Cartesian product of two triangles. The Hamming graph $H(d,3)$ is a Cartesian product of $d$ triangles, and again is locally linear.

=== From smaller graphs ===
Some graphs that are not themselves locally linear can be used as a framework to construct larger locally linear graphs. One such construction involves line graphs. For any graph $G$, the line graph $L(G)$ is a graph that has a vertex for every edge of $G$. Two vertices in $L(G)$ are adjacent when the two edges that they represent in $G$ have a common endpoint. If $G$ is a 3-regular triangle-free graph, then its line graph $L(G)$ is 4-regular and locally linear. It has a triangle for every vertex $v$ of $G$, with the vertices of the triangle corresponding to the three edges incident to $v$. Every 4-regular locally linear graph can be constructed in this way. For instance, the graph of the cuboctahedron is the line graph of a cube, so it is locally linear. The locally linear nine-vertex Paley graph, constructed above as a Cartesian product, may also be constructed in a different way as the line graph of the utility graph $K_{3,3}$. The line graph of the Petersen graph is also locally linear by this construction. It has a property analogous to the cages: it is the smallest possible graph in which the largest clique has three vertices, each vertex is in exactly two edge-disjoint cliques, and the shortest cycle with edges from distinct cliques has length five.

The cuboctahedron, a planar locally linear graph that can be formed as the line graph of a cube or by gluing antiprisms onto the inside and outside faces of a 4-cycle

A more complicated expansion process applies to planar graphs. Let $G$ be a planar graph embedded in the plane in such a way that every face is a quadrilateral, such as the graph of a cube. Gluing a square antiprism onto each face of $G$, and then deleting the original edges of $G$, produces a new locally linear planar graph. The numbers of edges and vertices of the result can be calculated from Euler's polyhedral formula: if $G$ has $n$ vertices, it has exactly $n-2$ faces, and the result of replacing the faces of $G$ by antiprisms has $5(n-2)+2$ vertices and $12(n-2)$ edges. For instance, the cuboctahedron can again be produced in this way, from the two faces (the interior and exterior) of a 4-cycle. The removed 4-cycle of this construction can be seen on the cuboctahedron as a cycle of four diagonals of its square faces, bisecting the polyhedron.

=== Algebraic constructions ===
Certain Kneser graphs, graphs constructed from the intersection patterns of equal-size sets, are locally linear. Kneser graphs are described by two parameters, the size of the sets they represent and the size of the universe from which these sets are drawn. The Kneser graph $K G_{a,b}$ has $\tbinom{a}{b}$ vertices (in the standard notation for binomial coefficients), representing the $b$-element subsets of an $a$-element set. In this graph, two vertices are adjacent when the corresponding subsets are disjoint sets, having no elements in common. In the special case when $a=3b$, the resulting graph is locally linear, because for each two disjoint $b$-element subsets $X$ and $Y$ there is exactly one other $b$-element subset disjoint from both of them, consisting of all the elements that are neither in $X$ nor in $Y$. The resulting locally linear graph has $\tbinom{3b}{b}$ vertices and $\tfrac{1}{2}\tbinom{3b}{b}\tbinom{2b}{b}$ edges. For instance, for $b=2$ the Kneser graph $KG_{6,2}$ is locally linear with 15 vertices and 45 edges.

Locally linear graphs can also be constructed from progression-free sets of numbers. Let $p$ be a prime number, and let $A$ be a subset of the numbers modulo $p$ such that no three members of $A$ form an arithmetic progression modulo $p$. (That is, $A$ is a Salem–Spencer set modulo $p$.) This set can be used to construct a tripartite graph with $3p$ vertices and $3p\cdot|A|$ edges that is locally linear. To construct this graph, make three sets of vertices, each numbered from $0$ to $p-1$. For each number $x$ in the range from $0$ to $p-1$ and each element $a$ of $A$, construct a triangle connecting the vertex with number $x$ in the first set of vertices, the vertex with number $x+a$ in the second set of vertices, and the vertex with number $x+2a$ in the third set of vertices. Form a graph as the union of all of these triangles. Because it is a union of triangles, every edge of the resulting graph belongs to a triangle. However, there can be no other triangles than the ones formed in this way. Any other triangle would have vertices numbered $(x,x+a,x+a+b)$ where $a$, $b$, and $c=(a+b)/2$ all belong to $A$, violating the assumption that there be no arithmetic progressions $(a,c,b)$ in $A$. For example, with $p=3$ and $A=\{\pm 1\}$, the result of this construction is the nine-vertex Paley graph.

The triangles in a locally linear graph can be equivalently thought of as forming a 3-uniform hypergraph. Such a hypergraph must be linear, meaning that no two of its hyperedges (the triangles) can share more than one vertex. The locally linear graph itself is the Gaifman graph of the hypergraph, the graph of pairs of vertices that belong to a common hyperedge. In this view it makes sense to talk about the girth of the hypergraph. In graph terms, this is the length of the shortest cycle that is not one of the triangles of the graph. An algebraic construction based on polarity graphs (also called Brown graphs) has been used, in this context, to find dense locally linear graphs that have no 4-cycles; their hypergraph girth is five. A polarity graph is defined from a finite projective plane, and a polarity, an incidence-preserving bijection between its points and its lines. The vertices of the polarity graph are points, and an edge connects two points whenever one is polar to a line containing the other. More algebraically, the vertices of the same graph can be represented by homogeneous coordinates: these are triples of values $(x,y,z)$ from a finite field, not all zero, where two triples define the same point in the plane whenever they are scalar multiples of each other. Two points, represented by triples in this way, are adjacent when their inner product is zero. The polarity graph for a finite field of odd order $q$ has $q^2+q+1$ vertices, of which $q+1$ are self-adjacent and do not belong to any triangles. When these are removed, the result is a locally linear graph with $q^2$ vertices, $\bigl(\tfrac12+o(1)\bigr)q^3$ edges, and hypergraph girth five, giving the maximum possible number of edges for a locally linear graph of this girth up to lower-order terms.

== Regularity ==
=== Regular graphs with few vertices ===
A graph is regular when all of its vertices have the same degree, the number of incident edges. Every locally linear graph must have even degree at each vertex, because the edges at each vertex can be paired up into triangles. The Cartesian product of two locally linear regular graphs is again locally linear and regular, with degree equal to the sum of the degrees of the factors. Therefore, one can take Cartesian products of locally linear graphs of degree two (triangles) to produce regular locally linear graphs of every even degree.

The $2r$-regular locally linear graphs must have at least $6r-3$ vertices, because there are this many vertices among any triangle and its neighbors alone. (No two vertices of the triangle can share a neighbor without violating local linearity.) Regular graphs with exactly this many vertices are possible only when $r$ is 1, 2, 3, or 5, and are uniquely defined for each of these four cases. The four regular graphs meeting this bound on the number of vertices are the 3-vertex 2-regular triangle $K_3$, the 9-vertex 4-regular Paley graph, the 15-vertex 6-regular Kneser graph $KG_{6,2}$, and the 27-vertex 10-regular complement graph of the Schläfli graph. The final 27-vertex 10-regular graph also represents the intersection graph of the 27 lines on a cubic surface.

=== Strongly regular graphs ===
A strongly regular graph can be characterized by a quadruple of parameters $(n,k,\lambda,\mu)$ where $n$ is the number of vertices, $k$ is the number of incident edges per vertex, $\lambda$ is the number of shared neighbors for every adjacent pair of vertices, and $\mu$ is the number of shared neighbors for every non-adjacent pair of vertices. When $\lambda=1$ the graph is locally linear. The locally linear graphs already mentioned above that are strongly regular graphs and their parameters are

- the triangle (3,2,1,0),
- the nine-vertex Paley graph (9,4,1,2),
- the Kneser graph $KG_{6,2}$ (15,6,1,3), and
- the complement of the Schläfli graph (27,10,1,5).

Other locally linear strongly regular graphs include

- the Brouwer–Haemers graph (81,20,1,6),
- the Berlekamp–van Lint–Seidel graph (243,22,1,2),
- the Cossidente–Penttila graph (378,52,1,8), and
- the Games graph (729,112,1,20).

Other potentially-valid combinations with $\lambda=1$ include (99,14,1,2) and (115,18,1,3) but it is unknown whether strongly regular graphs with those parameters exist. The question of the existence of a strongly regular graph with parameters (99,14,1,2) is known as Conway's 99-graph problem, and John Horton Conway has offered a $1000 prize for its solution.

=== Distance-regular graphs ===
There are finitely many distance-regular graphs of degree 4 or 6 that are locally linear. Beyond the strongly regular graphs of the same degrees, they also include the line graph of the Petersen graph, the Hamming graph $H(3,3)$, and the halved Foster graph.

== Density ==
The densest possible locally linear planar graphs are formed by gluing an antiprism (red vertices and black edges) into each quadrilateral face of a planar graph (blue vertices and dashed yellow edges)

One formulation of the Ruzsa–Szemerédi problem asks for the maximum number of edges in an $n$-vertex locally linear graph. As Imre Z. Ruzsa and Endre Szemerédi proved, this maximum number is $o(n^2)$ but is $\Omega(n^{2-\varepsilon})$ for every $\varepsilon>0$. The construction of locally linear graphs from progression-free sets leads to the densest known locally linear graphs, with $n^2/\exp O(\sqrt{\log n})$ edges. (In these formulas, $o$, $\Omega$, and $O$ are examples of little o notation, big Omega notation, and big O notation, respectively.)

Among planar graphs, the maximum number of edges in a locally linear graph with $n$ vertices is $\tfrac{12}{5}(n-2)$. The graph of the cuboctahedron is the first in an infinite sequence of polyhedral graphs with $n=5k+2$ vertices and $\tfrac{12}{5}(n-2)=12k$ edges, for $k=2,3,\dots$, constructed by expanding the quadrilateral faces of $K_{2,k}$ into antiprisms. These examples show that the $\tfrac{12}{5}(n-2)$ upper bound can be attained.

Every locally linear graph has the property that it remains connected after any matching is removed from it, because in any path through the graph, each matched edge can be replaced by the other two edges of its triangle. Among the graphs with this property, the least dense are the triangular cactus graphs, which are also the least dense locally linear graphs.

== Applications ==
One application of locally linear graphs occurs in the formulation of Greechie diagrams, which are used in quantum logic to help determine whether certain Hilbert space equations can be inferred from each other. In this application, the triangles of locally linear graphs form the blocks of Greechie diagrams with block size three. The Greechie diagrams corresponding to lattices come from the locally linear graphs of hypergraph girth five or more, as constructed for instance from polarity graphs.

A combination of random sampling and a graph removal lemma can be used to find large high-girth 3-uniform hypergraphs within arbitrary 3-uniform linear hypergraphs or partial Steiner triple systems. This method can then be used to prove asymptotically tight lower bounds on the independence number of 3-uniform linear hypergraphs and partial Steiner triple systems.
