= Centre Européen de Calcul Atomique et Moléculaire =

European Center for Atomic and Molecular Calculations
- Centre Européen de Calcul Atomique et Moléculaire
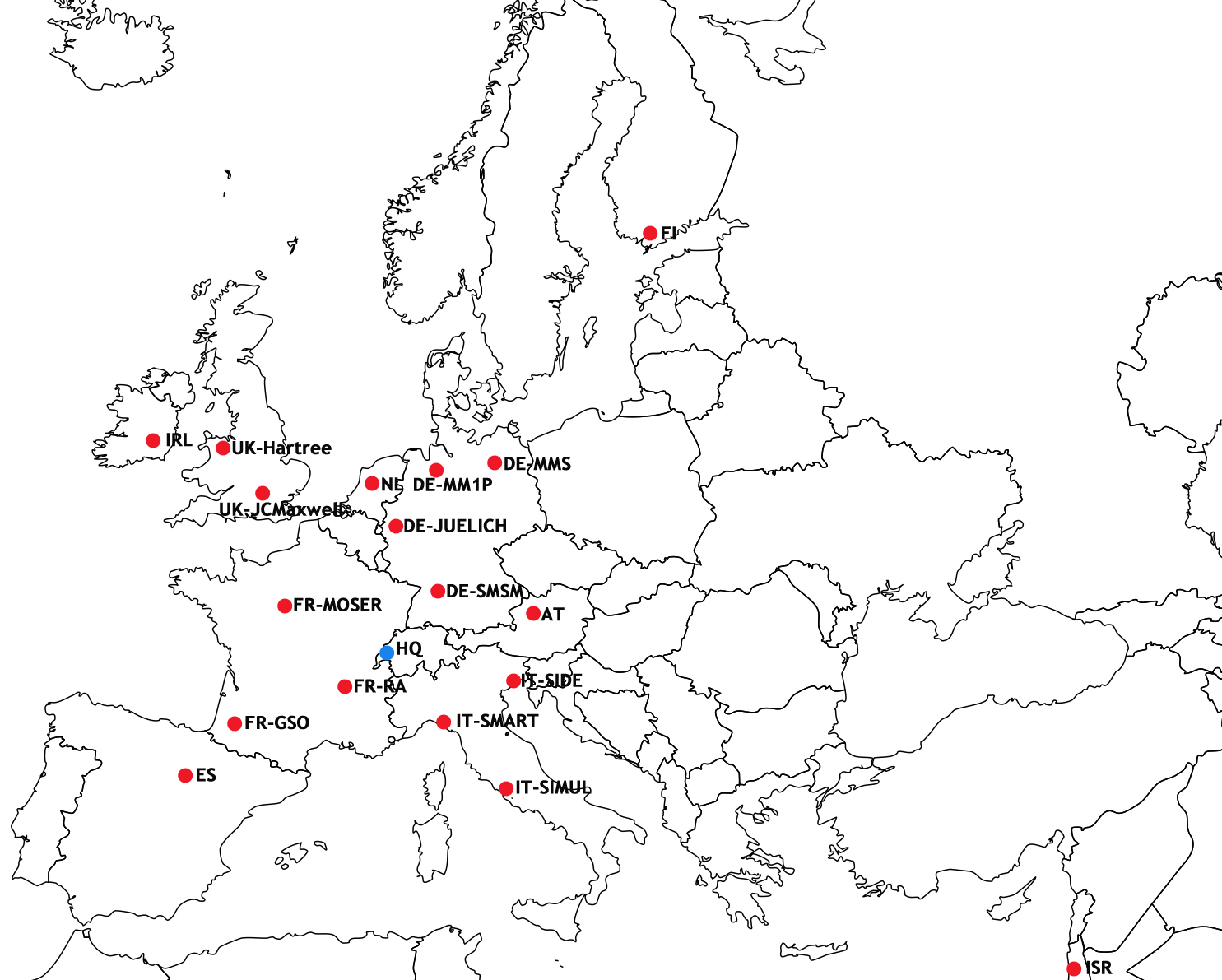
- Location of CECAM Nodes (red) and HQ (blue)
- Established: 1969
- Director: Andrea Cavalli
- President of the Council: Stefan Blügel
- Location: Écublens (near Lausanne), Vaud, Switzerland; 46°31′13″N 6°33′56″E
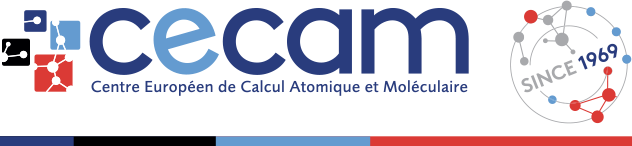

Location: Lausanne, Switzerland

The Centre Européen de Calcul Atomique et Moléculaire (CECAM), is the longest standing European Institute for the promotion of fundamental research on advanced computational methods and their application to problems in frontier areas of science and technology. Its current headquarters is based on the EPFL (École Polytechnique Fédérale de Lausanne) campus in Lausanne, Switzerland.

Activities to create CECAM begun in 1967, but its date of birth was set to October 1969 by its founding father, Carl Moser. Since then, CECAM has evolved from a single focal point for simulation and modelling into a network of 17 nodes across Europe and in Israel, with its headquarters (HQ) at EPFL. It is governed by a convention signed by 26 member organizations located in 13 European countries, Israel, China and the United States, which include National Research Councils, Research and HPC Centres, and Universities, from which it receives funding for ordinary activities. The CECAM nodes are, for the most part, consortia of more than one institution, constituting a network of academic and research partners located in 10 European countries and Israel.

CECAM activities, across all of the nodes, include the organization of scientific workshops in emerging areas; specialist schools to train at the graduate and postdoctoral level; workshops on software development; brain-storming and problem solving events; the development of collaborative research projects for Europe and beyond; and the sponsorship of an international visitors programs. We welcome applications to organize events and to establish networks through CECAM from everybody interested in computational science.

== Member Organizations ==
CECAM is supported by member organizations from 13 European countries, Israel, China and the United States. These Organizations are listed in Table 1. Each Member Organization nominates two representatives to the Cecam Council, the governing body that has the ultimate responsibility for all strategy and operations of the Center.

Table 1: Member Organizations
Country	Member Organization
Austria	CMS (Center for Computational Materials Science)
Belgium	FRS-FNRS (Fonds de la Recherce Scientifique)
	FWO (Fonds Wetenschappelijk Onderzoek-Vlaanderen)
China	IoP+CSRC (Institute of Physics, the Chinese Academy of Sciences and the Beijing Computational Science Research Center)
Finland	Aalto University
France	CEA (Commissariat à l'Energie Atomique)
	CNRS (Centre National de la Recherche Scientifique)
Germany	DFG (Deutsche Forschungsgemeinschaft)
	MPG (Max Planck Gesellschaft)
	FZJ (Forschungszentrum Jülich GmbH)
Ireland	IUA (Irish University Association)
Israel	TAU (Tel Aviv University)
Italy	CNR (Consiglio Nazionale delle Ricerche)
	IIT (Italian Institute of Technology)
	SISSA (Scuola Internazionale di Studi Avanzati)
	SNS (Scuola Normale Superiore)
	UNIBO (The University of Bologna)+CINECA
Slovenia	SLING (Slovenian National Supercomputing Network)
Spain	MINECO (Ministerio de Ciencia e Innovación)
Sweden	Uppsala University
Switzerland	EPFL (Ecole Polytechnique Fédérale de Lausanne)
	FNS-SNF (Fonds National Suisse de la Recherche Scientifique; Schweizerischer Nationalfonds zur Förderung der wissenchaftlichen Forschung)
The Netherlands	NWO (The Nederlandse Organisatie voor Wetenschappelijk Onderzoek)
United Kingdom	UKRI STFC (UK Research and Innovation - Science and Technology Facilities Council)
	UKRI EPSRC (UK Research and Innovation - Engineering and Physical Sciences Research Council)
United States	UChicago (The University of Chicago)

== Nodes ==
Nodes contribute to CECAM activities by organising and hosting workshops and schools at the level of the network (Flagship events) and locally (Node events). They initiate or participate in CECAM research and training activities, host a visitor program and promote research in computational science in their region. A CECAM node is a research structure inside a larger Institution, or a consortium of such Institutions whose activities and relationships are regulated by a formal agreement. The Directors of the nodes administer the program taking place at their respective locations, possibly in collaboration with other nodes or the Headquarters. The Directors constitute the CECAM Board of Directors, working towards a coordinated optimal selection and distribution of activities throughout the network.
