= International Journal of Circuit Theory and Applications =

- Discipline: Circuit theory, electronics engineering
- Language: English
- Edited by: Ahmed Elwakil

Publication details
- History: 1973–present
- Publisher: Wiley
- Frequency: Monthly
- Impact factor: 1.6 (2024)

Standard abbreviations
- ISO 4: Int. J. Circuit Theory Appl.

Indexing
- ISSN: 0098-9886 (print); 1097-007X (web)
- LCCN: 77640127
- OCLC no.: 751004092

Links
- Journal homepage; Online access; Online archive

International Journal of Circuit Theory and Applications is a peer-reviewed scientific journal, published monthly by Wiley. It covers research on circuit theory and its applications in engineering problems and applied mathematics, with a focus on electrical engineering. Its current Editor-in-Chief is Ahmed Elwakil (University of Sharjah/University of Calgary).

== Abstracting and indexing ==
The journal is abstracted and indexed in:

- Current Contents/Engineering, Computing & Technology
- EBSCO databases
- Ei Compendex
- Inspec
- ProQuest databases
- Science Citation Index Expanded
- Scopus
- Zentralblatt Math

According to the Journal Citation Reports, the journal has a 2024 impact factor of 1.6.
