= Paley graph =

Graph of numbers differing by a square

- The Paley graph of order 13
- Named after: Raymond Paley
- Vertices: q ≡ 1 mod 4, q prime power
- Edges: q(q − 1)/4
- Diameter: 2
- Properties: Strongly regular Conference graph Self-complementary
- Notation: QR(q)

In mathematics, Paley graphs are undirected graphs constructed from the members of a suitable finite field by connecting pairs of elements that differ by a quadratic residue. The Paley graphs form an infinite family of conference graphs, which yield an infinite family of symmetric conference matrices. Paley graphs allow graph-theoretic tools to be applied to the number theory of quadratic residues, and have interesting properties that make them useful in graph theory more generally.

Paley graphs are named after Raymond Paley. They are closely related to the Paley construction for constructing Hadamard matrices from quadratic residues. They were introduced as graphs independently by Sachs (1962) and Erdős & Rényi (1963). Sachs was interested in them for their self-complementarity properties, while Erdős and Rényi studied their symmetries.

Paley digraphs are directed analogs of Paley graphs that yield antisymmetric conference matrices. They were introduced by Graham & Spencer (1971) (independently of Sachs, Erdős, and Rényi) as a way of constructing tournaments with a property previously known to be held only by random tournaments: in a Paley digraph, every small subset of vertices is dominated by some other vertex.

== Definition ==
Let q be a prime power such that $q \equiv 1 \pmod 4$. That is, q should either be an arbitrary power of a prime congruent to 1 mod 4 (a Pythagorean prime) or an even power of an odd non-Pythagorean prime. This choice of q implies that in the unique finite field F_{q} of order q, the element −1 has a square root.

Now let V = F_{q} and let

$$E= \left \{\{a,b\} \ : \ a-b\in (\mathbf{F}_q^{\times})^2 \right \}$$.

If a pair {a,b} is included in E, it is included under either ordering of its two elements. For, a − b = −(b − a), and −1 is a square, from which it follows that a − b is a square if and only if b − a is a square.

By definition G = (V, E) is the Paley graph of order q.

The sequence of orders of the Paley graphs begins

1, 5, 9, 13, 17, 25, 29, 37, 41, 49, 53, 61, 73, ... (sequence A085759 in the OEIS)

== Example ==
For q = 13, the field F_{q} is just integer arithmetic modulo 13. The numbers with square roots mod 13 are:

- ±1 (square roots ±1 for +1, ±5 for −1)
- ±3 (square roots ±4 for +3, ±6 for −3)
- ±4 (square roots ±2 for +4, ±3 for −4).

Thus, in the Paley graph, we form a vertex for each of the integers in the range [0,12], and connect each such integer x to six neighbors: x ± 1 (mod 13), x ± 3 (mod 13), and x ± 4 (mod 13).

== Properties ==
The Paley graphs are self-complementary: the complement of any Paley graph is isomorphic to it. One isomorphism is via the mapping that takes a vertex x to xk (mod q), where k is any quadratic nonresidue mod q.

Paley graphs are strongly regular graphs, with parameters

$$srg \left (q, \tfrac{1}{2}(q-1),\tfrac{1}{4}(q-5),\tfrac{1}{4}(q-1) \right ).$$

This in fact follows from the fact that the graph is arc-transitive and self-complementary. The strongly regular graphs with parameters of this form (for an arbitrary q) are called conference graphs, so the Paley graphs form an infinite family of conference graphs. The adjacency matrix of a conference graph, such as a Paley graph, can be used to construct a conference matrix, and vice versa. These are matrices whose coefficients are ±1, with zero on the diagaonal, that give a scalar multiple of the identity matrix when multiplied by their transpose.

The eigenvalues of Paley graphs are $\tfrac{1}{2}(q-1)$ (with multiplicity 1) and $\tfrac{1}{2} (-1 \pm \sqrt{q})$ (both with multiplicity $\tfrac{1}{2}(q-1)$). They can be calculated using the quadratic Gauss sum or by using the theory of strongly regular graphs.

If q is prime, the isoperimetric number i(G) of the Paley graph satisfies the following bounds:

$\displaystyle\frac{q-\sqrt{q}}{4}\leq i(G) \leq \frac{q-1}{4}.$

When q is prime, the associated Paley graph is a Hamiltonian circulant graph.

Paley graphs are quasi-random: the number of times each possible constant-order graph occurs as a subgraph of a Paley graph is (in the limit for large q) the same as for random graphs, and large sets of vertices have approximately the same number of edges as they would in random graphs.

- The Paley graph of order 9 is a locally linear graph, a rook's graph, and the graph of the 3-3 duoprism.
- The Paley graph of order 13 has book thickness 4 and queue number 3.
- The Paley graph of order 17 is the unique largest graph G such that neither G nor its complement contains a complete 4-vertex subgraph. It follows that the Ramsey number R(4, 4) = 18.
- The Paley graph of order 101 is currently the largest known graph G such that neither G nor its complement contains a complete 6-vertex subgraph.
- Sasukara et al. (1993) use Paley graphs to generalize the construction of the Horrocks–Mumford bundle.

== Paley digraphs ==
Let q be a prime power such that q = 3 (mod 4). Thus, the finite field of order q, F_{q}, has no square root of −1. Consequently, for each pair (a,b) of distinct elements of F_{q}, either a − b or b − a, but not both, is a square. The Paley digraph is the directed graph with vertex set V = F_{q} and arc set

$$A = \left \{(a,b)\in \mathbf{F}_q\times\mathbf{F}_q \ : \ b-a\in (\mathbf{F}_q^{\times})^2 \right \}.$$

The Paley digraph is a tournament because each pair of distinct vertices is linked by an arc in one and only one direction.

The Paley digraph leads to the construction of some antisymmetric conference matrices and biplane geometries.

== Genus ==
Torus embedding of the order-13 Paley graph, obtained by gluing each pair of parallel sides of a hexagon

The six neighbors of each vertex in the Paley graph of order 13 are connected in a cycle; that is, the graph is locally cyclic. Therefore, this graph can be embedded as a Whitney triangulation of a torus, in which every face is a triangle and every triangle is a face. More generally, if any Paley graph of order q could be embedded so that all its faces are triangles, we could calculate the genus of the resulting surface via the Euler characteristic as $\tfrac{1}{24}(q^2 - 13q + 24)$. Bojan Mohar conjectures that the minimum genus of a surface into which a Paley graph can be embedded is near this bound in the case that q is a square, and questions whether such a bound might hold more generally. Specifically, Mohar conjectures that the Paley graphs of square order can be embedded into surfaces with genus

$$(q^2 - 13q + 24)\left(\tfrac{1}{24} + o(1)\right),$$

where the o(1) term can be any function of q that goes to zero in the limit as q goes to infinity.

White (2001) finds embeddings of the Paley graphs of order q ≡ 1 (mod 8) that are highly symmetric and self-dual, generalizing a natural embedding of the Paley graph of order 9 as a 3×3 square grid on a torus. However the genus of White's embeddings is higher by approximately a factor of three than Mohar's conjectured bound.
