= Bohemian matrices =

Set of matrices

A Bohemian matrix family is a set of matrices whose entries are members of a fixed, finite, and discrete set, referred to as the "population". The term "Bohemian" was first used to refer to matrices with entries consisting of integers of bounded height, hence the name, derived from the acronym BOunded HEight Matrix of Integers (BOHEMI). The majority of published research on these matrix families studies populations of integers, although this is not strictly true of all possible Bohemian matrices. There is no single family of Bohemian matrices. Instead, a matrix can be said to be Bohemian with respect to a set from which its entries are drawn. Bohemian matrices may possess additional structure. For example, they may be Toeplitz matrices or upper Hessenberg matrices.

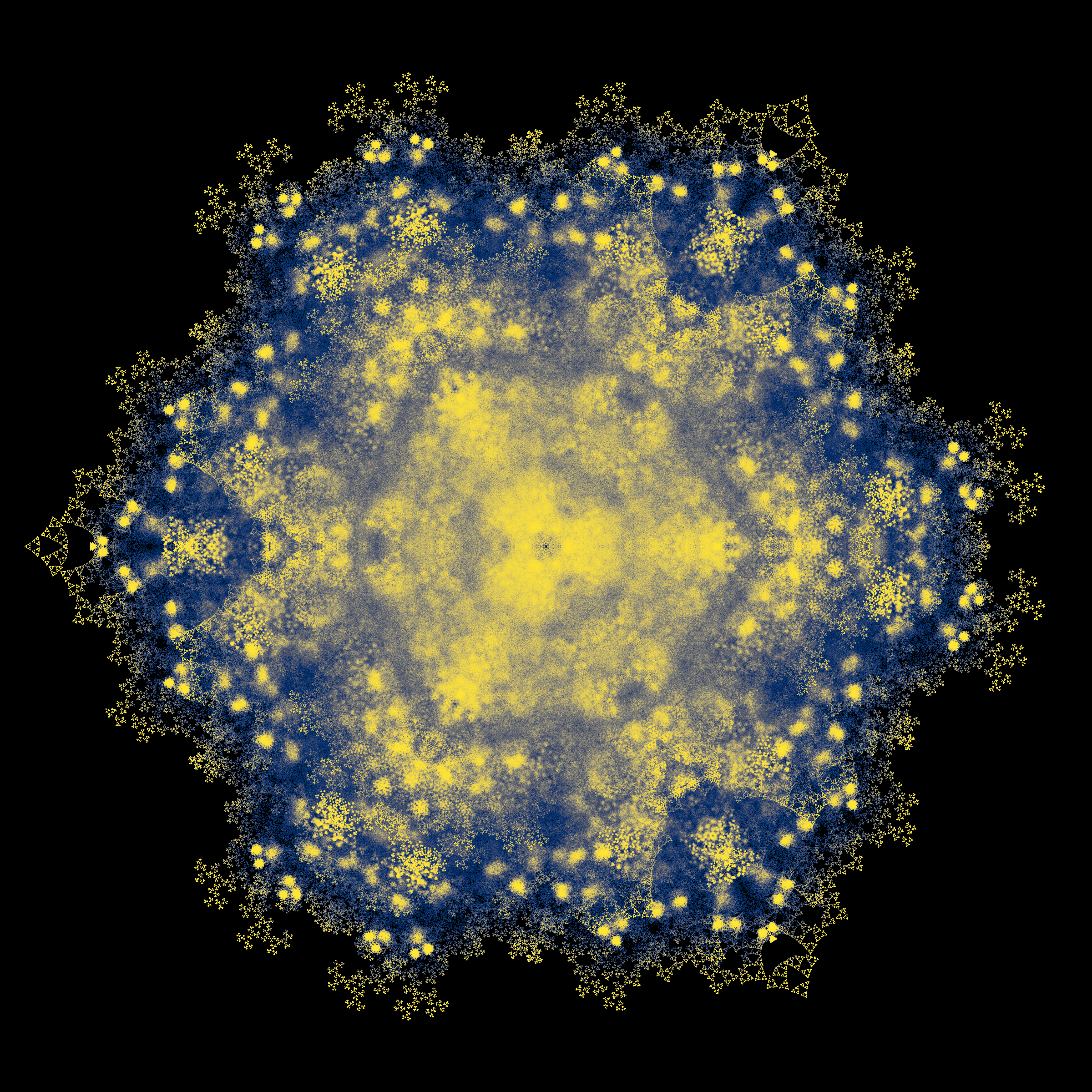
A density plot of all eigenvalues of all dimensions in 15x15 Bohemian upper Hessenberg zero diagonal matrices with population cube roots of -1

== Applications ==
=== Software testing ===
Bohemian matrices are used in software testing, particularly in linear algebra applications. They are often distinctly represented on computers and are identifiable for extreme behavior through exhaustive search (for small dimensions), random sampling, or optimization techniques. Steven E. Thornton utilized these concepts to develop a tool that solved over two trillion eigenvalue problems, revealing instances of convergence failure in some popular software systems.

The anymatrix toolbox is an extensible MATLAB matrix tool that provides a set of sorted Bohemian matrices and utilities for property-based queries of the set.

=== Improved bounds ===
In a presentation at the 2018 Bohemian Matrices and Applications Workshop, Nick Higham (co-author of the anymatrix toolbox) discussed how he used genetic algorithms on Bohemian matrices with population P={-1, 0, 1} to refine lower bounds on the maximal growth factor for rook pivoting.

== Connections to other fields ==
=== Random matrices ===
Bohemian matrices can be studied through random sampling, a process that intersects with the field of random matrices. However, the study of random matrices has predominantly focused on real symmetric or Hermitian matrices, or matrices with entries drawn from a continuous distribution, such as Gaussian ensembles. Notable exceptions to this focus include the work of Terence Tao and Van Vu.

=== Bernoulli and Hadamard matrices ===
The term Bernoulli matrices is sometimes used to describe matrices with entries constrained to ±1, classifying them as Bohemian matrices. A Hadamard matrix is a Bernoulli matrix that satisfies an additional property, namely that its determinant is maximal. Hadamard matrices (and Bernoulli matrices) have been studied for far longer than the term "Bohemian matrix" has existed. The questions posed about Hadamard matrices, such as those concerning maximal determinants, can also be applied to other Bohemian matrices. One generalization of Hadamard matrices includes Butson-type Hadamard matrices, whose entries are qth roots of unity for q > 2, and can also be considered prototypical Bohemian matrices.

=== Graph theory ===
Matrices with discrete entries, particularly incidence matrices, play a crucial role in understanding graph theory. The results from graph theory research can elucidate phenomena observed in Bohemian matrix experiments. Conversely, experiments conducted using Bohemian matrices can provide valuable insights into graph-related problems.

=== Combinatorics ===
Several open problems listed in the Encyclopedia of Integer Sequences concerning Bohemian matrices are combinatoric in nature. For instance, A306782 lists a table of the number of distinct minimal polynomials for Bernoulli matrices (Bohemian matrices with entries ±1) up to dimension 5. The numbers for higher dimensions remain unknown. The number of valid Bernoulli matrices of dimension 6 is 2^{36}=68,719,476,736; while this set could be exhaustively searched (it is delightfully parallel), the greater-than-exponential growth of the number of matrices quickly grows beyond the limits of numerical analysis. There are symmetries that might be taken advantage of, as is done for zero-one matrices, but these require sophisticated combinatorial knowledge.

=== Number theory ===
Many number theorists have studied polynomials with restricted coefficients. For instance, Littlewood polynomials have coefficients ±1 in the monomial basis. Researchers such as Kurt Mahler, Andrew Odlyzko, Bjorn Poonen and Peter Borwein have contributed to this field. By using companion matrices, these polynomial problems with restricted coefficients can be framed as Bohemian matrix problems. However, the characteristic polynomial of a Bohemian matrix may have coefficients that are exponentially large in the matrix dimension, so the reverse transformation is not always applicable.

Connections to Magic Squares are explored in Kathleen Ollerenshaw's book with D. Brée. Furthermore, Bohemian matrices are explicitly connected to quadratic forms in certain papers.

=== Solution of polynomial equations ===
To find the roots of a polynomial, one can construct a corresponding companion matrix and solve for its eigenvalues. These eigenvalues correspond to the roots of the original polynomial. This method is commonly used in NumPy's polynomial package and is generally numerically stable, though it may occasionally struggle with polynomials that have large coefficients or are ill-conditioned.

Improving this situation involves finding a minimal height companion matrix for the polynomial within a Bohemian matrix family. However, no efficient general-purpose techniques are currently known for this approach.

== History ==
The term "Bohemian matrices" and the concept of categorizing problems in this manner first appeared in a publication by ISSAC in 2016. The name originated from the mnemonic BOunded HEight Matrix of Integers (BOHEMI), although the classification has since been expanded to include other discrete populations, such as Gaussian integers. The utility and scope of this categorization are becoming increasingly recognized, with the first significant journal publication following smaller earlier publications. As of March 2022, several publications explicitly use the term "Bohemian matrices," in addition to those already cited in this article.

The inaugural workshop on Bohemian matrices was held in 2018 at the University of Manchester, titled "Bohemian Matrices and Applications." The concept is akin to the specialization suggested by George Pólya, titled "Bohemian Matrices and Applications." The concept is akin to the specialization suggested by Littlewood polynomial.

This concept shares similarities with sign pattern matrices, where two matrices with real entries are deemed equivalent if corresponding entries have the same sign. A Bohemian matrix with the population P={-1, 0, 1} is an example of a sign pattern matrix and adheres to the defined properties but may also exhibit unique characteristics specific to its Bohemian nature.
