= Fekete =

Fekete (Hungarian for “black”) may refer to:

- Fekete (surname)
- Fânaţe (Fekete in Hungarian), a village in Band Commune, Mureș County, Romania
- Fekete polynomial
- Franz Fekete Stadium
