= Regular Hadamard matrix =

In mathematics a regular Hadamard matrix is a Hadamard matrix whose row and column sums are all equal. While the order of a Hadamard matrix must be 1, 2, or a multiple of 4, regular Hadamard matrices carry the further restriction that the order must be a square number. The excess, denoted E(H ), of a Hadamard matrix H of order n is defined to be the sum of the entries of H. The excess satisfies the bound |E(H )| ≤ n^{3/2}. A Hadamard matrix attains this bound if and only if it is regular.

== Parameters ==
If n = 4u^{2} is the order of a regular Hadamard matrix, then the excess is ±8u^{3} and the row and column sums all equal ±2u. It follows that each row has 2u^{2} ± u positive entries and 2u^{2} ∓ u negative entries. The orthogonality of rows implies that any two distinct rows have exactly u^{2} ± u positive entries in common. If H is interpreted as the incidence matrix of a block design, with 1 representing incidence and −1 representing non-incidence, then H corresponds to a symmetric 2-(v,k,λ) design with parameters (4u^{2}, 2u^{2} ± u, u^{2} ± u). A design with these parameters is called a Menon design.

== Construction ==
Unsolved problem in mathematics
Which square numbers can be the order of a regular Hadamard matrix?
More unsolved problems in mathematics

A number of methods for constructing regular Hadamard matrices are known, and some exhaustive computer searches have been done for regular Hadamard matrices with specified symmetry groups, but it is not known whether every even perfect square is the order of a regular Hadamard matrix. Bush-type Hadamard matrices are regular Hadamard matrices of a special form, and are connected with finite projective planes.

A regular Hadamard matrix that is also circulant corresponds to a Menon design with a regular cyclic automorphism group. The existence of such circulant examples of order greater than 4 is the subject of Ryser's conjecture on circulant Hadamard matrices, which conjectures that none exist.

== History and naming ==
Like Hadamard matrices more generally, regular Hadamard matrices are named after Jacques Hadamard. Menon designs are named after P Kesava Menon, and Bush-type Hadamard matrices are named after Kenneth A. Bush.

== See also ==
- Ryser's conjecture on circulant Hadamard matrices
