= Harold S. Shapiro =

American mathematician (1928–2021)

Harold Shapiro
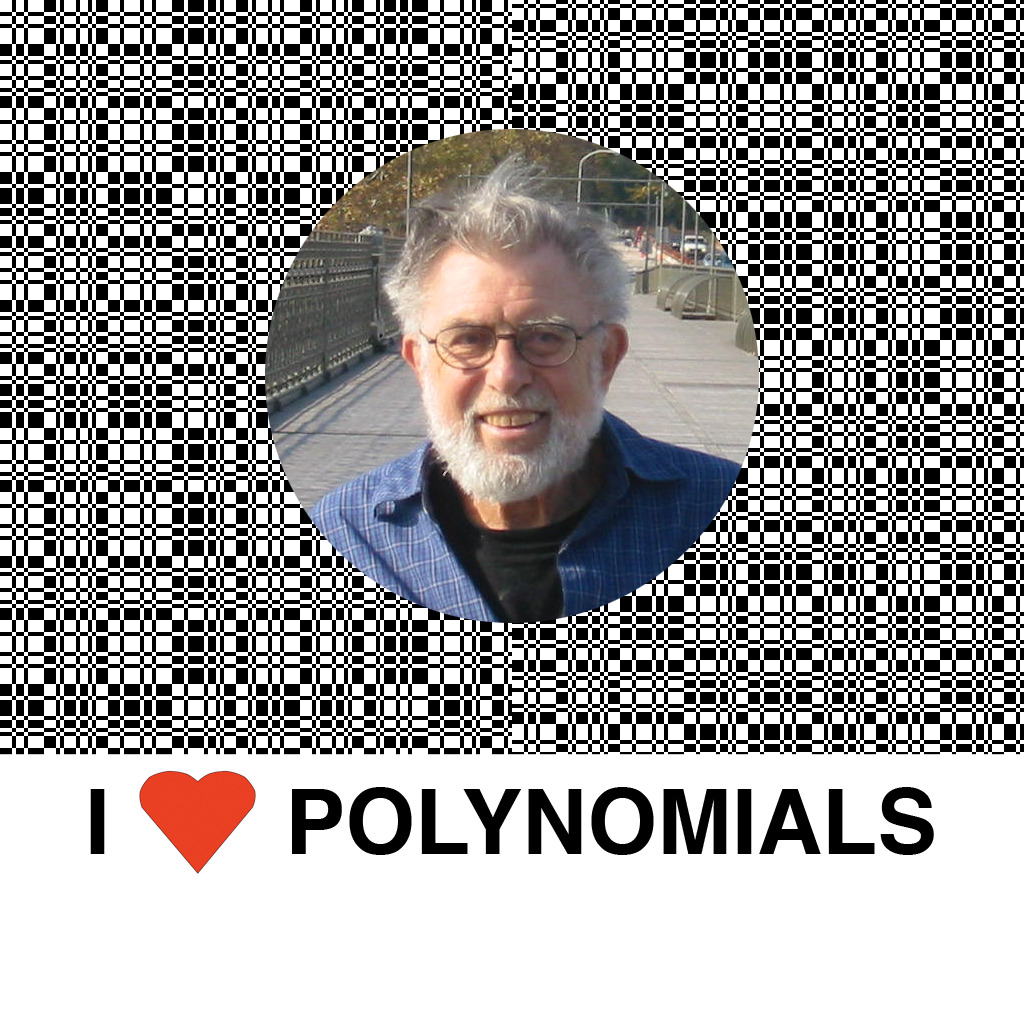
- Born: April 2, 1928; New York, United States
- Died: March 5, 2021 (aged 92); Stockholm, Sweden
- Education: City College of New York; MIT
- Known for: Shapiro inequality Shapiro polynomials Rudin–Shapiro sequence
- Scientific career
- Fields: Mathematics
- Workplaces: Royal Institute of Technology
- Doctoral advisor: Norman Levinson

Harold Seymour Shapiro (2 April 1928 – 5 March 2021) was a professor of mathematics at the Royal Institute of Technology in Stockholm, Sweden, best known for inventing the so-called Shapiro polynomials (also known as Golay–Shapiro polynomials or Rudin–Shapiro polynomials) and for work on quadrature domains.

== Biography ==
Born and raised in Brooklyn, New York, to a Jewish family, Shapiro earned a B.Sc. from the City College of New York in 1949 and earned his M.S. degree from the Massachusetts Institute of Technology in 1951. He received his Ph.D. in 1952 from MIT; his thesis was written under the supervision of Norman Levinson. He was the father of cosmologist Max Tegmark, a graduate of the Royal Institute of Technology and now a professor at MIT. Shapiro died on 5 March 2021, aged 92.

== Academic career ==
His main research areas were approximation theory, complex analysis, functional analysis, and partial differential equations. He was also interested in the pedagogy of problem-solving. He collaborated with Paul Erdős in June 1965 on "Large and small subspaces of Hilbert space", therefore he has an Erdős number of 1.

== See also ==
- Rudin–Shapiro sequence
- List of Jewish mathematicians
