= Fekete problem =

In mathematics, the Fekete problem is, given a natural number N and a real s ≥ 0, to find the points x_{1},...,x_{N} on the 2-sphere for which the s-energy, defined by

$$\sum_{1 \leq i < j \leq N} \|x_i - x_j \|^{-s}$$

for s > 0 and by

$$\sum_{1 \leq i < j \leq N} \log \|x_i - x_j \|^{-1}$$

for s = 0, is minimal. For s > 0, such points are called s-Fekete points, and for s = 0, logarithmic Fekete points (see Saff & Kuijlaars (1997)). More generally, one can consider the same problem on the d-dimensional sphere, or on a Riemannian manifold (in which case ||x_{i} −x_{j}|| is replaced with the Riemannian distance between x_{i} and x_{j}).

The problem originated in the paper by Michael Fekete (1923) who considered the one-dimensional, s = 0 case, answering a question of Issai Schur.

An algorithmic version of the Fekete problem is number 7 on the list of problems discussed by Smale (1998).
