= Shapiro polynomials =

In mathematics, the Shapiro polynomials are a sequence of polynomials which were first studied by Harold S. Shapiro in 1951 when considering the magnitude of specific trigonometric sums. In signal processing, the Shapiro polynomials have good autocorrelation properties and their values on the unit circle are small. The first few members of the sequence are:

$$\begin{align}
P_1(x) & {} =1 + x \\
P_2(x) & {} =1 + x + x^2 - x^3 \\
P_3(x) & {} =1 + x + x^2 - x^3 + x^4 + x^5 - x^6 + x^7 \\
... \\
Q_1(x) & {} =1 - x \\
Q_2(x) & {} =1 + x - x^2 + x^3 \\
Q_3(x) & {} =1 + x + x^2 - x^3 - x^4 - x^5 + x^6 - x^7 \\
... \\
\end{align}$$

where the second sequence, indicated by Q, is said to be complementary to the first sequence, indicated by P.

== Construction ==
The Shapiro polynomials P_{n}(z) may be constructed from the Golay–Rudin–Shapiro sequence a_{n}, which equals 1 if the number of pairs of consecutive ones in the binary expansion of n is even, and −1 otherwise. Thus a_{0} = 1, a_{1} = 1, a_{2} = 1, a_{3} = −1, etc.

The first Shapiro P_{n}(z) is the partial sum of order 2^{n} − 1 (where n = 0, 1, 2, ...) of the power series

f(z) := a_{0} + a_{1} z + a_{2} z^{2} + ...

The Golay–Rudin–Shapiro sequence {a_{n}} has a fractal-like structure – for example, a_{n} = a_{2n} – which implies that the subsequence (a_{0}, a_{2}, a_{4}, ...) replicates the original sequence {a_{n}}. This in turn leads to remarkable functional equations satisfied by f(z).

The second or complementary Shapiro polynomials Q_{n}(z) may be defined in terms of this sequence, or by the relation Q_{n}(z) = (−1)^{n}z^{2^{n}−1}P_{n}(−1/z), or by the recursions

$$P_0(z)=1; ~~ Q_0(z) = 1 ;$$
$$P_{n+1}(z) = P_n(z) + z^{2^n} Q_n(z) ;$$
$$Q_{n+1}(z) = P_n(z) - z^{2^n} Q_n(z) .$$

== Properties ==
Zeroes of the polynomial of degree 255

The sequence of complementary polynomials Q_{n} corresponding to the P_{n} is uniquely characterized by the following properties:

- (i) Q_{n} is of degree 2^{n} − 1;
- (ii) the coefficients of Q_{n} are all 1 or −1, and its constant term equals 1; and
- (iii) the identity |P_{n}(z)|^{2} + |Q_{n}(z)|^{2} = 2^{(n + 1)} holds on the unit circle, where the complex variable z has absolute value one.

The most interesting property of the {P_{n}} is that the absolute value of P_{n}(z) is bounded on the unit circle by the square root of 2^{(n + 1)}, which is on the order of the L^{2} norm of P_{n}. Polynomials with coefficients from the set {−1, 1} whose maximum modulus on the unit circle is close to their mean modulus are useful for various applications in communication theory (e.g., antenna design and data compression). Property (iii) shows that (P, Q) form a Golay pair.

These polynomials have further properties:

$$P_{n+1}(z) = P_n(z^2) + z P_n(-z^2) ; \,$$
$$Q_{n+1}(z) = Q_n(z^2) + z Q_n(-z^2) ; \,$$
$$P_n(z) P_n(1/z) + Q_n(z) Q_n(1/z) = 2^{n+1} ; \,$$
$$P_{n+k+1}(z) = P_n(z)P_k(z^{2^{n+1}}) + z^{2^n}Q_n(z)P_k(-z^{2^{n+1}}) ; \,$$
$$P_n(1) = 2^{\lfloor (n+1)/2 \rfloor}; {~}{~} P_n(-1) = (1+(-1)^n)2^{\lfloor n/2 \rfloor - 1} . \,$$

== See also ==
- Littlewood polynomials
