= Michael Fekete =

Israeli-Hungarian mathematician (1886–1957)

- מיכאל פקטה
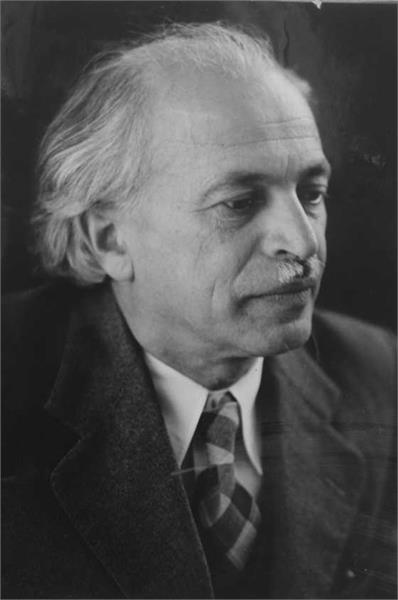
- Fekete in 1940
- Born: Mihály Fekete; 19 July 1886; Zenta, Austria-Hungary, (today Senta, Serbia)
- Died: 13 May 1957 (aged 70); Jerusalem, Israel
- Education: University of Budapest
- Known for: Fekete's lemma, Fekete polynomial
- Awards: Israel Prize for Exact Sciences (1955)
- Scientific career
- Fields: Mathematics
- Workplaces: Budapest University; Hebrew University
- Doctoral advisor: Lipót Fejér
- Doctoral students: Aryeh Dvoretzky; Michael Bahir Maschler; Zeev Nehari; Menahem Max Schiffer

Michael (Mihály) Fekete (Hebrew: מיכאל פקטה; 19 July 1886 – 13 May 1957) was a Hungarian-Israeli mathematician.

== Biography ==
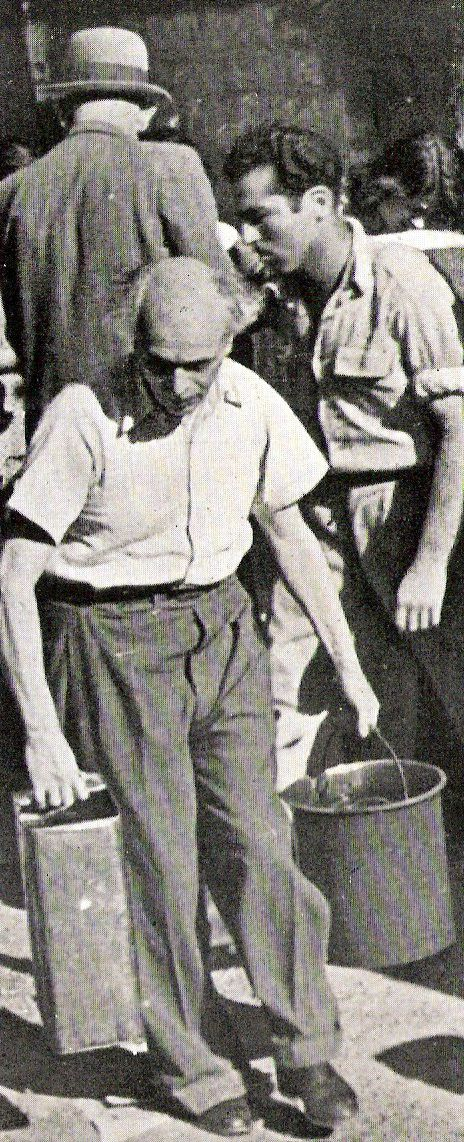
Mathematics professor Michael Fekete, the Provost of the Hebrew University of Jerusalem, with his water quota, during the siege of Jerusalem

Michael Fekete was born in Zenta, Austria-Hungary (today Senta, Serbia). He received his PhD in 1909 from the University of Budapest (later renamed Eötvös Loránd University). He studied under Lipót Fejér. After completing his PhD he switched to University of Göttingen, which was considered a mathematics hub. In 1914, he returned to the University of Budapest, where he attained the title of Privatdozent.

Fekete also worked as a private math tutor. Among his students was János Neumann. In 1922, Fekete published a paper together with Neumann on extremal polynomials, which was Neumann's first scientific paper. Fekete dedicated the majority of his scientific work to the transfinite diameter.

In 1928 Fekete immigrated to Mandate Palestine and was among the first instructors of the Institute of Mathematics at the Hebrew University of Jerusalem. In 1929 he was promoted to professor, and eventually headed the institute, succeeding Edmund Landau and Adolf Abraham Halevi Fraenkel. He later became the dean of Natural Sciences, and between the years 1946–1948 he was Hebrew University Provost.

Among his students were Aryeh Dvoretzky and Michael Bahir Maschler.

== Awards and recognition ==
In 1955, Fekete was awarded the Israel Prize for exact sciences.

== See also ==
- Fekete problem
- Fekete polynomial
- Fekete–Szegő inequality
- Fekete's lemma
- Fekete constant

== Literature ==
- Joseph, Anthony; Melnikov, Anna; Rentschler, Rudolf (2003). Studies in Memory of Issai Schur. New York: Springfield. ISBN 978-1-4612-0045-1.
- Hersh, Reuben (2015). Peter Lax, Mathematician. American Mathematical Soc. p. 168. ISBN 978-1-4704-1708-6.
