= Ronald Hugh Barker =

British physicist (1915–2015)

Ronald Hugh Barker FIEE FIMechE FInstP CEng
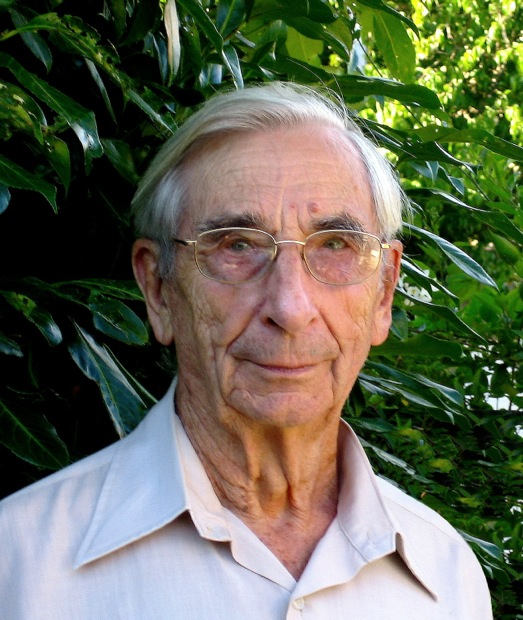
- Barker in 2008
- Born: 28 October 1915; Dublin, Ireland
- Died: 7 October 2015 (aged 99); Bournemouth, England
- Resting place: Verwood cemetery, Dorset, England
- Education: University of Hull BSc 1938 University of London PhD 1954
- Known for: Barker code
- Awards: IEE Heaviside Premium (1953) FIET(1960) FIMechE 1974) Fellow of the Institute of Physics(1962) Chartered Engineer (UK)(1966)
- Scientific career
- Fields: Physicist Radar Telemetry Encryption and Electrical Engineering
- Workplaces: Signals Research and Development Establishment; Central Electricity Research Laboratories Leatherhead CEGB; Pullin Group (Rank Organisation); Royal Armament Research and Development Fort Halstead
- Thesis: The Servo Problem Involved in the Transmission of Angular Data by Pulse Code Modulation (1954)

Ronald Hugh Barker FIEE (28 October 1915 – 7 October 2015) was a British physicist, mathematician and engineer whose work led to the identification of the binary sequences now known as Barker codes, first described by Barker in 1953. These sequences have favourable autocorrelation properties that allow reliable detection and timing synchronisation of signals in the presence of noise, and are widely used in radar, digital communication and other signal processing systems.

Barker was born in Ireland and spent his professional career in the United Kingdom. He worked for much of his early career at the Signals Research and Development Establishment (SRDE), where he became superintendent in charge. His research on signal detection and coding contributed to developments in radar and digital communication techniques during the early development of modern electronic and information systems.

== Early life and education ==
Ronald Hugh Barker was born in Dublin, in 1915 when Ireland was part of the United Kingdom of Great Britain and Ireland to English parents. His education was disrupted by his father's frequent periods of unemployment and moves between Dublin, England and America to find work as an artist. At age 13, Barker (known as Roy) passed the entrance exam and was admitted to a new school, The Cedars (now known as Cedars Upper School) in Leighton Buzzard. Less than a year later his father died of pneumonia in Youghal, Co. Cork, Ireland. Despite the difficulties he excelled at school. His mother, a school teacher, assisted in his education and taught him to play the piano. Barker became very interested in emerging electronics building his own crystal and wireless sets. After matriculation he won a scholarship to University College Hull and in 1938 was awarded a 1st Class Honours degree in physics by the University of London.

== Early career and wartime work ==
In 1938 Barker joined Standard Telephones and Cables in London, working as a physicist on thermionic valves and X-ray equipment. With the outbreak of the Second World War, scientists were designated as a reserved occupation, allowing Barker to continue technical research rather than being conscripted. In 1941 he moved to the Signals Experimental Establishment of the Ministry of Supply. Following wartime relocations, the organisation became the Signals Research and Development Establishment (SRDE) at Christchurch in 1943. Barker's early work involved assisting with the design and testing of military radio and telemetry systems. This included the electronics of two-way radios for jungle use and the wireless sets used in armoured vehicles during the war. After the end of hostilities much of his work focused around the representation of data in binary number form and its application to servomechanism systems using pulse code modulation. Barker authored a classified report, code named Messina, on telemetry systems used in the German A4 (V-2) rocket programme at Peenemünde in 1945.

== Post-war career ==
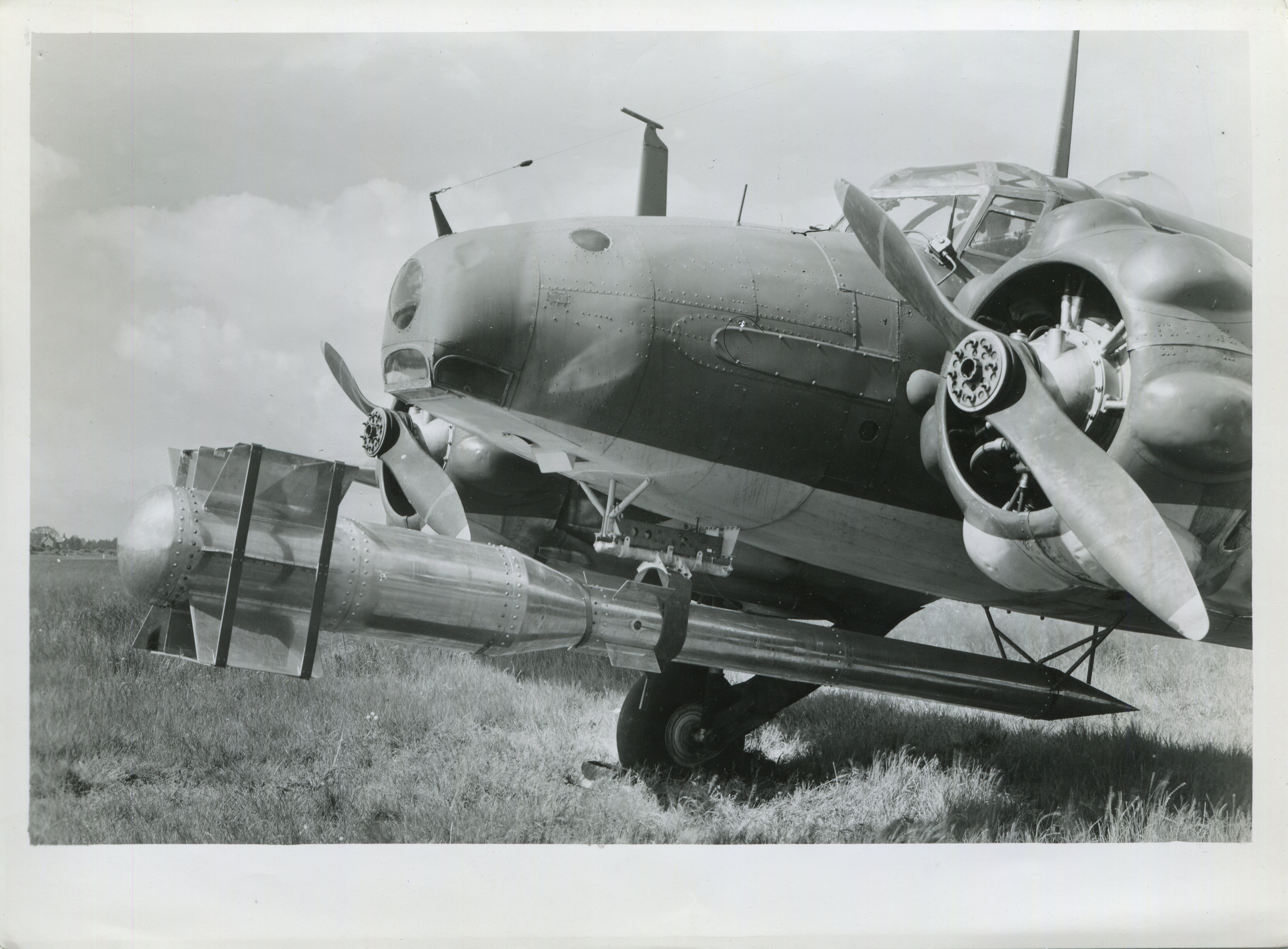
Avro Anson with missile taken at Somerford airfield, Christchurch 1946

Following the war, Barker’s research increasingly focused on the theoretical and practical challenges of digital and sampled data systems, at a time when analogue signal methods still dominated engineering practice. He investigated the effects of sampling, quantisation, and time delay on system stability, and developed early methods for representing mechanical motion in digital form.

In 1945, telemetry was becoming increasingly important in military applications, particularly for missile and aircraft testing. Initially the G.A.P. (Guided Air Projectile) system was used which allowed for real-time data collection and analysis, essential for improving their performance.

A year later he was promoted to senior scientific officer and became responsible for advanced research in communications, telemetry, and guidance successfully developing and testing the first British telemetry-guided surface-to-air missile employing real-time telemetry for command guidance. The project is known as LOPGAP (Liquid Oxygen Propelled Anti-aircraft Guided Projectile) Weapons testing initially occurred at Ynyslas. The technology required reliable data transmission, synchronisation and control under extreme conditions. Barker’s work addressed issues related to signal encoding and three dimensional problems of controlling flight remotely. Robustness against electronic noise (signal processing) was key, a problem that would later inform his research into digital synchronisation and coding.

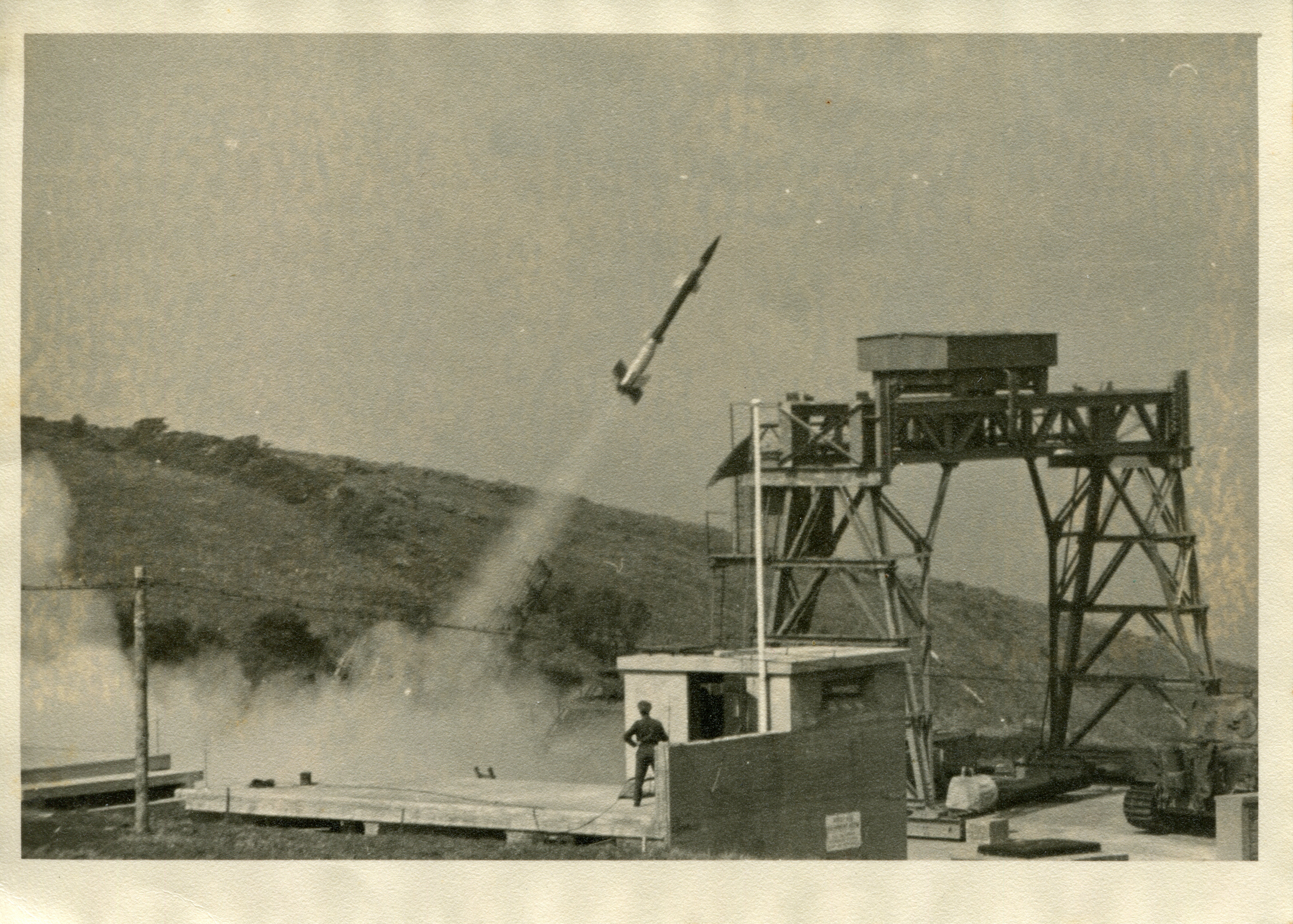
Telemetry trials at Ynyslas, Wales, 1945

That same year Barker attended the first International Telemetering Symposium at Princeton University, New Jersey. He read two papers describing his guidance system as part of the classified Anglo-American “Bumblebee” research collaboration on guided missiles, pilotless aircraft and projectiles at supersonic speed. Bumblebee report No 42 included examples of nearly all possible systems of modulation and multiplexing were reported in this historic document.

In 1947, Barker was quickly promoted again to principal scientific officer. He was asked to see how the digital technology could be integrated with radar into aircraft tracking. His memorandum describes one of the earliest air traffic control systems utilising digital electronics by combining graphical displays with synchronised digital data transmission and aircraft identifiers enabling the information be sent digitally with a synchronising signal via a telephone cable using teleprinters to other users.

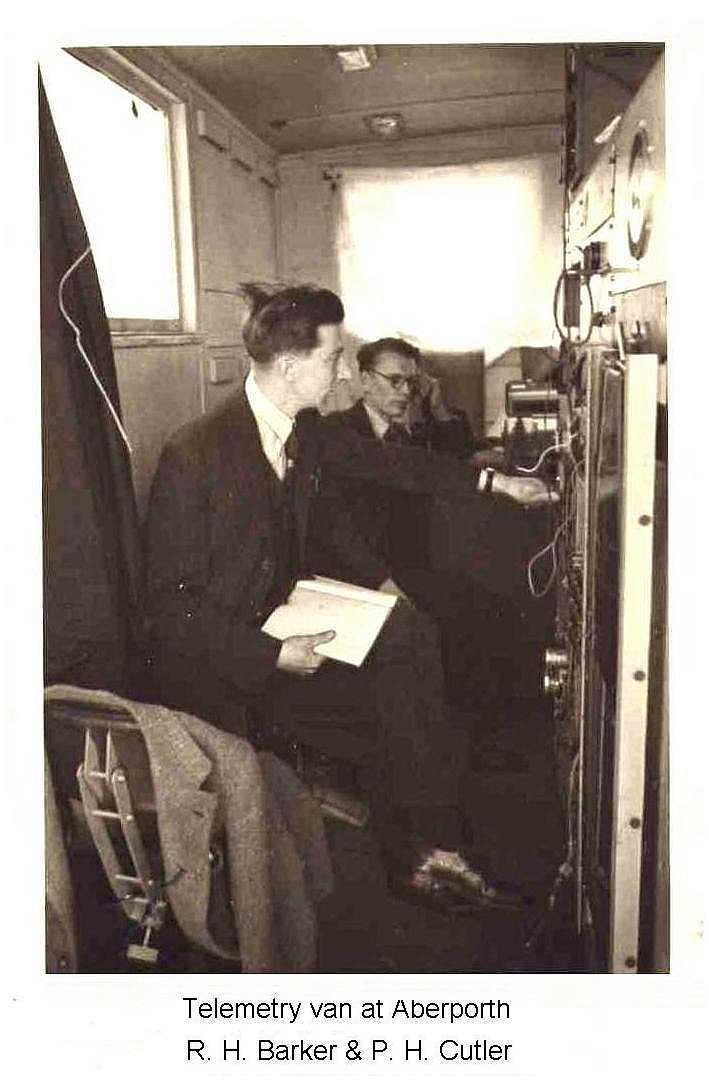

In 1948 he published an application for a patent which converted linear and angular movement into digital data. In this application he states: "The invention is described throughout almost the entire specification in relation to data presented in the form of the angular position of a rotatable shaft but it will be appreciated that the methods and apparatus described are equally applicable to the measurement and recording of the position of a member capable of movement in a linear manner and consequently for a member capable of any conceivable movement". It was one of the first developments towards automation and robotics. The device is widely known as a rotary encoder. The patent granted is "Improvements in or relating to apparatus for the representation of data in a binary digital form".

In 1951 this work led to one of the earliest practical designs of the rotary encoder that was successfully tested to convert angular or linear motion into binary digital signals suitable for digital processing and feedback control. Such devices were critical in translating mechanical motion into discrete electrical signals suitable for digital processing and feedback, particularly in weapons control, radar, power systems, and industrial automation.

Between 1952 and 1956 he published a series of influential papers on pulse-code modulation and digital servo systems essential for weapons control. In these he introduced the z-transform as a practical analytical tool for discrete-time systems, analogous to the Laplace transform for continuous systems. His work included the first published table of z-transforms and earned him the Oliver Heaviside Premium of the Institution of Electrical Engineers in 1953.

Barker also researched cryptography to perform speech encryption and secure data transmission. He used a technique by which speech waveforms were encoded digitally employing early computing techniques and pseudorandom binary sequences.

== Barker code ==
Barker is best known for identifying a class of short binary sequences with uniquely favourable autocorrelation properties, described by Ronald Hugh Barker in his 1953 paper on group synchronisation of digital systems. These sequences are widely used as they allow reliable detection and timed synchronisation of signals in the presence of noise. Barker showed that certain finite sequences minimise side-lobe levels in the autocorrelation function, producing a single dominant peak at zero lag. This property makes the sequences particularly effective for synchronisation and ranging in noisy data environments.

Barker originally developed the codes to address practical problems in radar, missile telemetry, and digital speech transmission, where reliable frame and timing recovery were critical. At the time, digital communication systems were highly susceptible to noise, multipath interference, and timing uncertainty. Barker codes allowed receivers to detect synchronisation points with high confidence even at low signal-to-noise ratios. Only a small number of Barker sequences exist, with code lengths up to 13 bits. Despite this limitation, their simplicity and robustness led to widespread adoption in early digital systems. They were first used in a range of applications, including early radar systems, missile guidance telemetry, and space missions such as Apollo, Skylab, Pioneer, and Viking.

The Oxford Dictionary of Computer Science defines a Barker sequence as “a sequence of symbols (binary or q-ary) that has zero autocorrelation except at the coincidence position”, enabling the detection and correction of synchronisation errors in received data streams.

== Work and legacy ==
Barker is best known for his invention of Barker codes, which allow reliable detection and timing synchronisation of signals in the presence of noise. Because of these properties, Barker sequences and sophisticated variations emanating from them have been adopted in a variety of other applications. Examples can be found in text books on radar for high resolution target detection and digital communication systems.

Another notable application is the direct-sequence spread spectrum physical layer of IEEE 802.11 wireless LANs, where an 11-chip Barker sequence is used to spread each transmitted bit in the original DSSS data rates. Barker sequences have also been used in satellite navigation receivers and telemetry systems, where their favourable autocorrelation properties assist in signal acquisition and synchronisation.

In medical and industrial applications, Barker-coded excitation has also been used in ultrasound imaging and non-destructive ultrasonic testing to improve detection sensitivity and in weather forecasting

== Senior appointments and later career ==
Barker was awarded a PhD by the University of London in 1954, followed by promotion to senior principal scientific officer. He subsequently held senior administrative and technical posts within the Ministry of Supply, overseeing research in airborne radar, navigation aids, and air communications. In 1957 Barker returned to SRDE as Superintendent of Research. In 1959 he became Director of the Central Electricity Research Laboratories at Leatherhead, overseeing major research programmes in power systems, telemetry, masers and automation. Later in 1962 he became a Director of the Pullin Group Ltd (later part of the Rank Organisation) responsible for Research, Development and Inspection. From 1965 until his retirement in 1979, Barker served as Deputy Director of the Royal Armament Research and Development Establishment at Fort Halstead, with responsibility for the assessment of non-nuclear weapons systems.

== Professional recognition and personal life ==
Barker was elected Fellow of the Institute of Physics (1962), the Institution of Electrical Engineers (1966), and the Institution of Mechanical Engineers (1974). He was a member of the IEE for over 70 years, serving on numerous IEE committees and was a member of the IEE Council from 1972 to 1974. The IEE is now The Institution of Engineering and Technology.

Barker’s contributions span military communication and guidance, fundamental digital communication theory leading to improved civilian digital infrastructure. While his name is most closely associated with Barker codes, his broader work reflects the transition from analogue to digital engineering in mid-20th-century Britain and the early integration of computation, automation control systems and communication.

He married Wendy Hunt in 1943 and had two sons. In retirement he was an active bridge player, competing at county level well into his nineties. Barker died in Bournemouth on 7 October 2015, aged 99.
