= Fekete–Szegő inequality =

Statement in complex analysis

In mathematics, the Fekete–Szegő inequality is an inequality for the coefficients of univalent analytic functions found by Fekete and Szegő (1933), related to the Bieberbach conjecture. Finding similar estimates for other classes of functions is called the Fekete–Szegő problem.

The Fekete–Szegő inequality states that if

$$f(z)=z+a_2z^2+a_3z^3+\cdots$$

is a univalent analytic function on the unit disk and $0\leq \lambda < 1$, then

$$|a_3-\lambda a_2^2|\leq 1+2\exp(-2\lambda /(1-\lambda)).$$
