= Connective constant =

Number associated with self-avoiding walks

In mathematics, the connective constant is a numerical quantity associated with self-avoiding walks on a lattice. It is studied in connection with the notion of universality in two-dimensional statistical physics models. While the connective constant depends on the choice of lattice so itself is not universal (similarly to other lattice-dependent quantities such as the critical probability threshold for percolation), it is nonetheless an important quantity that appears in conjectures for universal laws. Furthermore, the mathematical techniques used to understand the connective constant, for example in the recent rigorous proof by Duminil-Copin and Smirnov that the connective constant of the hexagonal lattice has the precise value $\sqrt{2+\sqrt{2}}$, may provide clues to a possible approach for attacking other important open problems in the study of self-avoiding walks, notably the conjecture that self-avoiding walks converge in the scaling limit to the Schramm–Loewner evolution.

== Definition ==
The connective constant is defined as follows. Let $c_n$ denote the number of n-step self-avoiding walks starting from a fixed origin point in the lattice. Since every n + m step self avoiding walk can be decomposed into an n-step self-avoiding walk and an m-step self-avoiding walk, it follows that $c_{n+m} \leq c_n c_m$. Then by applying Fekete's lemma to the logarithm of the above relation, the limit $\mu = \lim_{n \rightarrow \infty} c_n^{1/n}$ can be shown to exist. This number $\mu$ is called the connective constant, and clearly depends on the particular lattice chosen for the walk since $c_n$ does. The value of $\mu$ is precisely known only for two lattices, see below. For other lattices, $\mu$ has only been approximated numerically. It is conjectured that $c_n \approx \mu^n n^{\gamma-1}$ as n goes to infinity, where $\mu$ depends on the lattice, but the critical exponent $\gamma$ is universal (it depends on dimension, but not the specific lattice). In 2-dimensions it is conjectured that $\gamma = 43/32$

== Known values ==
| Lattice | Connective constant |
|---|---|
| Hexagonal | $2\cos\frac{\pi}{8}=\sqrt{2 + \sqrt{2}}\simeq 1.85$ |
| Triangular | $4.15079(4)$ |
| Square | $2.63815853032790(3)$ |
| Kagomé | $2.56062$ |
| Manhattan | $1.733535(3)$ |
| L-lattice | $1.5657(15)$ |
| $(3.12^2)$ lattice | $1.7110412...$ |
| $(4.8^2)$ lattice | $1.80883001(6)$ |

These values are taken from the 1998 Jensen–Guttmann paper and a more recent paper by Jacobsen, Scullard and Guttmann. The connective constant of the $(3.12^2)$ lattice, since each step on the hexagonal lattice corresponds to either two or three steps in it, can be expressed exactly as the largest real root of the polynomial

$$x^{12} - 4x^8 - 8x^7 - 4x^6 + 2x^4 + 8x^3 + 12x^2 + 8x + 2$$

given the exact expression for the hexagonal lattice connective constant. More information about these lattices can be found in the percolation threshold article.

== Duminil-Copin–Smirnov proof ==
In 2010, Hugo Duminil-Copin and Stanislav Smirnov published the first rigorous proof of the fact that $\mu=\sqrt{2 + \sqrt{2}}$ for the hexagonal lattice. This had been conjectured by Nienhuis in 1982 as part of a larger study of O(n) models using renormalization techniques. The rigorous proof of this fact came from a program of applying tools from complex analysis to discrete probabilistic models that has also produced impressive results about the Ising model among others. The argument relies on the existence of a parafermionic observable that satisfies half of the discrete Cauchy–Riemann equations for the hexagonal lattice. We modify slightly the definition of a self-avoiding walk by having it start and end on mid-edges between vertices. Let H be the set of all mid-edges of the hexagonal lattice. For a self-avoiding walk $\gamma$ between two mid-edges $a$ and $b$, we define $\ell(\gamma)$ to be the number of vertices visited and its winding $W_{\gamma}(a,b)$ as the total rotation of the direction in radians when $\gamma$ is traversed from $a$ to $b$. The aim of the proof is to show that the partition function

$$Z(x)=\sum_{\gamma: a\to H}x^{\ell(\gamma)}=\sum_{n=0}^{\infty}c_n x^n$$

converges for $x<x_c$ and diverges for $x>x_c$ where the critical parameter is given by $x_c=1/ \sqrt{2+\sqrt{2}}$. This immediately implies that $\mu=\sqrt{2+\sqrt{2}}$.

Given a domain $\Omega$ in the hexagonal lattice, a starting mid-edge $a$, and two parameters $x$ and $\sigma$, we define the parafermionic observable

$F(z)=\sum_{\gamma\subset\Omega:a\to z} e^{-i\sigma W_{\gamma}(a,z)}x^{\ell(\gamma)}.$

If $x=x_c=1/\sqrt{2 + \sqrt{2}}$ and $\sigma=5/8$, then for any vertex $v$ in $\Omega$, we have

$$(p-v)F(p) + (q-v)F(q) + (r-v)F(r)=0,$$

where $p,q,r$ are the mid-edges emanating from $v$. This lemma establishes that the parafermionic observable is divergence-free. It has not been shown to be curl-free, but this would solve several open problems (see conjectures). The proof of this lemma is a clever computation that relies heavily on the geometry of the hexagonal lattice.

Next, we focus on a finite trapezoidal domain $S_{T,L}$ with 2L cells forming the left hand side, T cells across, and upper and lower sides at an angle of $\pm \pi/3$. (Picture needed.) We embed the hexagonal lattice in the complex plane so that the edge lengths are 1 and the mid-edge in the center of the left hand side is positioned at −1/2. Then the vertices in $S_{T,L}$ are given by

$$V(S_{T,L})=\{ z\in V(\mathbb{H}) : 0 \leq Re(z)\leq \frac{3T+1}{2}, \; |\sqrt{3}Im(z)-Re(z)|\leq 3L\}.$$

We now define partition functions for self-avoiding walks starting at $a$ and ending on different parts of the boundary. Let $\alpha$ denote the left hand boundary, $\beta$ the right hand boundary, $\epsilon$ the upper boundary, and $\bar{\epsilon}$ the lower boundary. Let

$$A_{T,L}^x:=\sum_{\gamma \in S_{T,L}:a\to \alpha\setminus\{a\}} x^{\ell(\gamma)},\quad
B_{T,L}^x:=\sum_{\gamma \in S_{T,L}:a\to \beta} x^{\ell(\gamma)}, \quad
E_{T,L}^x:=\sum_{\gamma \in S_{T,L}:a\to \epsilon \cup \bar{\epsilon}} x^{\ell(\gamma)}.$$

By summing the identity

$$(p-v)F(p) + (q-v)F(q) + (r-v)F(r)=0$$

over all vertices in $V(S_{T,L})$ and noting that the winding is fixed depending on which part of the boundary the path terminates at, we can arrive at the relation

$$1=\cos(3\pi/8) A_{T,L}^{x_c} + B_{T,L}^{x_c} + \cos(\pi/4) E_{T,L}^{x_c}$$

after another clever computation. Letting $L\to\infty$, we get a strip domain $S_T$ and partition functions

$$A_{T}^x:=\sum_{\gamma \in S_{T}:a\to \alpha\setminus\{a\}} x^{\ell(\gamma)},\quad
B_{T}^x:=\sum_{\gamma \in S_{T}:a\to \beta} x^{\ell(\gamma)}, \quad
E_{T}^x:=\sum_{\gamma \in S_{T}:a\to \epsilon \cup \bar{\epsilon}} x^{\ell(\gamma)}.$$

It was later shown that $E_{T,L}^{x_c}=0$, but we do not need this for the proof. We are left with the relation

$$1=\cos(3\pi/8) A_{T,L}^{x_c} + B_{T,L}^{x_c}$$.

From here, we can derive the inequality

$$A_{T+1}^{x_c} - A_{T}^{x_c} \leq x_c (B_{T+1}^{x_c})^2$$

And arrive by induction at a strictly positive lower bound for $B_{T}^{x_c}$. Since $Z(x_c)\geq\sum_{T>0}B_T^{x_c}=\infty$, we have established that $\mu\geq\sqrt{2+\sqrt{2}}$.

For the reverse inequality, for an arbitrary self avoiding walk on the honeycomb lattice, we perform a canonical decomposition due to Hammersley and Welsh of the walk into bridges of widths $T_{-I}<\cdots < T_{-1}$ and $T_0>\cdots > T_j$. Note that we can bound

$$B_T^x\leq (x/x_c)^T B_T^{x_c}\leq (x/x_c)^T$$

which implies $\prod_{T>0}(1+B_T^x)<\infty$. Finally, it is possible to bound the partition function by the bridge partition functions

$$Z(x)\leq  \sum_{T_{-I} <\cdots < T_{-1},\; T_0>\cdots > T_j} 2 \left(\prod_{k=-I}^j B_{T_k}^x\right)=2\left(\prod_{T>0}(1+B_T^x)\right)^2<\infty.$$

And so, we have that $\mu=\sqrt{2+\sqrt{2}}=2\cos\frac{\pi}{8}$ as desired.

== Conjectures ==
Nienhuis argued in favor of Flory's prediction that the mean squared displacement of the self-avoiding random walk $\langle |\gamma(n)|^2 \rangle$ satisfies the scaling relation $\langle |\gamma(n)|^2 \rangle=\frac{1}{c_n} \sum_{n\;\mathrm{step\; SAW}}|\gamma(n)|^2=n^{2\nu +o(1)}$, with $\nu=3/4$. The scaling exponent $\nu$ and the universal constant $11/32$ could be computed if the self-avoiding walk possesses a conformally invariant scaling limit, conjectured to be a Schramm–Loewner evolution with $\kappa=8/3$.

== See also ==
- Percolation threshold
