= P Kesava Menon =

Indian mathematician (1917-1979)

Puliyakot Keshava Menon (1917 – 22 October 1979) was an Indian mathematician best known as Director of the Joint Cipher Bureau.

His sudden demise on 22 October 1979, ended active research in the areas of number theory, combinatorics, algebra and cryptography.

== Early life ==
P. Kesava Menon was born (1917) in Alathur, which is now part of the Palakkad District of Kerala state in India. His mother, Devaky Amma, hailed from the Kunissery Puliyakot family and, as per custom, Kesava Menon took his family name from his mother. His father, A K Krishnan Unni Kartha, hailed from Aiyiloor in the Palghat district. Menon grew up on Alathur under his uncle's supervision and hence his primary and high school education was conducted in modest surrounding at Alathur itself.

== Higher education ==
As was the custom for bright students from landed families those days, Menon had to travel to Madras city and join the Madras Christian College for his higher studies. There, he completed his MA in Mathematics and was awarded a scholarship to pursue research under the guidance of Prof R Vaidyanathaswamy. In 1941, the University of Madras awarded him a MSc Degree with a thesis entitled "Contributions to the theory of multiplicative arithmetic functions".

== Educator ==
Thereafter he was appointed lecturer at the Annamalai University, where he served for two years, before joining the staff of Madras Christian College again as a professor and warden of Seliyur Hall. He was devoted to his research work along with teaching, and, in 1948, he submitted his dissertation on "Contributions to the theory of numbers" for which he was conferred the highest and rarest degree of Doctor of Science (DSc).

He theorized and published the classical inequality theory, which is today known as "Kesava Menon's classical inequality theorem"

He published a paper on the subject of the continued fraction of the mathematician Ramanujan, as noted here in the Journal of the London Mathematical Society

== See also ==
- Menon design
- Menon's identity
