= Fekete polynomial =

Type of polynomial

Roots of the Fekete polynomial for p = 43

In mathematics, a Fekete polynomial is a polynomial

$$f_p(t):=\sum_{a=0}^{p-1} \left (\frac{a}{p}\right )t^a\,$$

where $\left(\frac{\cdot}{p}\right)\,$ is the Legendre symbol modulo some integer p > 1.

These polynomials were known in nineteenth-century studies of Dirichlet L-functions, and indeed to Dirichlet himself. They have acquired the name of Michael Fekete, who observed that the absence of real zeroes t of the Fekete polynomial with 0 < t < 1 implies an absence of the same kind for the L-function

$$L\left(s,\dfrac{x}{p}\right).\,$$

This is of considerable potential interest in number theory, in connection with the hypothetical Siegel zero near s = 1. While numerical results for small cases had indicated that there were few such real zeroes, further analysis reveals that this may indeed be a 'small number' effect.
