= Alternating step generator =

Form of pseudorandom number generator

In cryptography, an alternating step generator (ASG) is a cryptographic pseudorandom number generator used in stream ciphers, based on three linear-feedback shift registers. Its output is a combination of two LFSRs which are stepped (clocked) in an alternating fashion, depending on the output of a third LFSR.

The design was published in 1987 and patented in 1989 by C. G. Günther.

== Overview ==
Linear-feedback shift registers (LFSRs) are, statistically speaking, excellent pseudorandom generators, with good distribution and simple implementation. However, they cannot be used as-is because their output can be predicted easily.

An ASG comprises three linear-feedback shift registers, which we will call LFSR0, LFSR1 and LFSR2 for convenience. The output of one of the registers decides which of the other two is to be used; for instance if LFSR2 outputs a 0, LFSR0 is clocked, and if it outputs a 1, LFSR1 is clocked instead. The output is the exclusive OR of the last bit produced by LFSR0 and LFSR1. The initial state of the three LFSRs is the key.

Customarily, the LFSRs use primitive polynomials of distinct but close degree, preset to non-zero state, so that each LFSR generates a maximum length sequence. Under these assumptions, the ASG's output demonstrably has long period, high linear complexity, and even distribution of short subsequences.

Example code in C:

/* 16-bit toy ASG (much too small for practical usage); return 0 or 1. */
unsigned ASG16toy(void)
{
  static unsigned /* unsigned type with at least 16 bits */
    lfsr2  = 0x8102, /* initial state, 16 bits, must not be 0 */
    lfsr1  = 0x4210, /* initial state, 15 bits, must not be 0 */
    lfsr0  = 0x2492; /* initial state, 14 bits, must not be 0 */

  /* LFSR2 use  x^^16 + x^^14 + x^^13 + x^^11 + 1 */
  lfsr2 = (-(lfsr2&1))&0x8016 ^ lfsr2>>1;

  if (lfsr2&1)
    /* LFSR1 use  x^^15 + x^^14 + 1 */
    lfsr1 = (-(lfsr1&1))&0x4001 ^ lfsr1>>1;
  else
    /* LFSR0 use  x^^14 + x^^13 + x^^3 + x^^2 + 1 */
    lfsr0 = (-(lfsr0&1))&0x2C01 ^ lfsr0>>1;

  return (lfsr0 ^ lfsr1)&1;
}

An ASG is very simple to implement in hardware. In particular, contrary to the shrinking generator and self-shrinking generator, an output bit is produced at each clock, ensuring consistent performance and resistance to timing attacks.

== Security ==
Shahram Khazaei, Simon Fischer, and Willi Meier give a cryptanalysis of the ASG allowing various tradeoffs between time complexity and the amount of output needed to mount the attack, e.g. with asymptotic complexity $O(L^2.2^{2L/3})$ and $O(2^{2L/3})$ bits, where $L$ is the size of the shortest of the three LFSRs.
