= Cazac =

Cazac may refer to:

- Constant-amplitude zero-autocorrelation waveform
- Cazac, Haute-Garonne, a commune in the arrondissement of Saint-Gaudens in France
