= M-sequence =

An M-sequence may refer to:

- Regular sequence, which is an important topic in commutative algebra.
- A maximum length sequence, which is a type of pseudorandom binary sequence.
