= Shrinking generator =

Form of pseudorandom number generator

In cryptography, the shrinking generator is a form of pseudorandom number generator intended to be used in a stream cipher. It was published in Crypto 1993 by Don Coppersmith, Hugo Krawczyk and Yishay Mansour.

The shrinking generator uses two linear-feedback shift registers. One, called the A sequence, generates output bits, while the other, called the S sequence, controls their output. Both A and S are clocked; if the S bit is 1, then the A bit is output; if the S bit is 0, the A bit is discarded, nothing is output, and the registers are clocked again. This has the disadvantage that the generator's output rate varies irregularly, and in a way that hints at the state of S; this problem can be overcome by buffering the output. The random sequence generated by LFSR can not guarantee the unpredictability in secure system and various methods have been proposed to improve its randomness

Despite this simplicity, there are currently no known attacks better than exhaustive search when the feedback polynomials are secret. If the feedback polynomials are known, however, the best known attack requires less than A • S bits of output.

A variant is the self-shrinking generator.

== An implementation in Python ==
This example uses two Galois LFRSs to produce the output pseudorandom bitstream. The Python code can be used to encrypt and decrypt a file or any bytestream.

#!/usr/bin/env python3

import sys

# ----------------------------------------------------------------------------
# Crypto4o functions start here
# ----------------------------------------------------------------------------


class GLFSR:
    """Galois linear-feedback shift register."""

    def __init__(self, polynom, initial_value):
        print "Using polynom 0x%X, initial value: 0x%X." % (polynom, initial_value)

        self.polynom = polynom | 1
        self.data = initial_value
        tmp = polynom
        self.mask = 1

        while tmp != 0:
            if tmp & self.mask != 0:
                tmp ^= self.mask

            if tmp == 0:
                break

            self.mask <<= 1

    def next_state(self):
        self.data <<= 1

        retval = 0

        if self.data & self.mask != 0:
            retval = 1
            self.data ^= self.polynom

        return retval


class SPRNG:
    def __init__(self, polynom_d, init_value_d, polynom_c, init_value_c):
        print "GLFSR D0: ",
        self.glfsr_d = GLFSR(polynom_d, init_value_d)
        print "GLFSR C0: ",
        self.glfsr_c = GLFSR(polynom_c, init_value_c)

    def next_byte(self):
        byte = 0
        bitpos = 7

        while True:
            bit_d = self.glfsr_d.next_state()
            bit_c = self.glfsr_c.next_state()

            if bit_c != 0:
                bit_r = bit_d
                byte |= bit_r << bitpos

                bitpos -= 1

                if bitpos < 0:
                    break

        return byte


# ----------------------------------------------------------------------------
# Crypto4o functions end here
# ----------------------------------------------------------------------------


def main():
    prng = SPRNG(
        int(sys.argv[3], 16),
        int(sys.argv[4], 16),
        int(sys.argv[5], 16),
        int(sys.argv[6], 16),
    )

    with open(sys.argv[1], "rb") as f, open(sys.argv[2], "wb") as g:
        while True:
            input_ch = f.read(1)

            if input_ch == "":
                break

            random_ch = prng.next_byte() & 0xFF
            g.write(chr(ord(input_ch) ^ random_ch))


if __name__ == "__main__":
    main()

== See also ==
- FISH, an (insecure) stream cipher based on the shrinking generator principle
- Alternating step generator, a similar stream cipher
