= Dmitry Ageyev =

Russian scientist

- Born: Dmitry Vasilyevich Ageyev; February 21, 1911
- Died: July 31, 1997 (aged 86)
- Known for: theory of code division of signals
- Scientific career
- Fields: radio engineering
- Thesis: The Methods of Dealing with Noise in the Radio Reception

Dmitry Vasilyevich Ageyev (Russian: Дмитрий Васильевич Агеев; 21 February 1911 in Saint Petersburg, Russian Empire – 31 July 1997 in Nizhny Novgorod, Russia) was a Soviet and Russian scientist and educator in the field of radio engineering. He developed the theory of code division of signals during the radio reception, which is the basis for the construction of cellular networks on CDMA technology. Along with Vladimir Kotelnikov, he was one of the founders of the theory of optimum noise immunity that he developed throughout life, starting with a thesis at his institute.
