= Analog feedback shift register =

AFSR also stands for the Argonne Fast Source Reactor -- see list of nuclear reactors.
AFSR was also the abbreviation of the Armed Forces of South Russia.

An analog feedback shift register (AFSR) is a generalization of the (binary, digital) linear-feedback shift register (LFSR).

While binary LFSRs require less power to generate spread spectrum signals than AFSRs, AFSR receivers require less power (in theory) to synchronize to those signals than binary LFSR receivers.

As of 2005, AFSRs are still in research. AFSR techniques could make spread-spectrum receivers (such as GPS receivers and cell phones and Wi-Fi receivers and RFIDs) cost less and have longer battery lifetimes.
