= Quadrature-division multiple access =

Quadrature-division multiple access (QDMA) is a radio protocol. The term combines two standard terms in telecommunications, CDMA and QPSK.

== Applications ==
QDMA is used for local area networks, usually wireless short-range such as WiMax. CDMA and QDMA are especially suitable for modern communications, for example, the transmission of short messages such as SMS or MMS; communication when in motion (from cars, trains, etc.); the establishment of unplanned links.

== Benefits over TDMA and FDMA ==
The traditional TDMA and FDMA require a lot of overhead to set a link parameter with a new user, or to detect that a user left and their allocation is free to be allocated to another. In CDMA or QDMA, a new user is simply allocated a new code and is ready to go. It may impose a slight load on the spectrum, but the system is so devised as to absorb a controlled measure of collisions and continue operations at a high level of quality of service.
