= Polyphase sequence =

Sequence whose terms are complex roots of unity

In mathematics, a polyphase sequence is a sequence whose terms are complex roots of unity:

$$a_n = e^{i\frac{2\pi}{q}x_n} \,$$

where x_{n} is an integer.

Polyphase sequences are an important class of sequences and play important roles in synchronizing sequence design.

== See also ==
- Zadoff–Chu sequence
