= Constant-amplitude zero-autocorrelation waveform =

In signal processing, a constant-amplitude zero-autocorrelation waveform (CAZAC) is a periodic complex-valued signal with modulus one and out-of-phase periodic (cyclic) autocorrelations equal to zero. CAZAC sequences find application in wireless communication systems, for example in 3GPP Long Term Evolution for synchronization of mobile phones with base stations. Zadoff–Chu sequences are well-known CAZAC sequences with special properties.

== Example CAZAC sequence ==
For a CAZAC sequence of length $N$ where $M$ is relatively prime to $N$ the $k$th symbol $u_k$ is given by:

=== Even N ===
$u_k = \exp \left(j \frac{M \pi k^2}{N} \right)$

=== Odd N ===
$u_k = \exp \left(j \frac{M \pi k (k+1)}{N} \right)$

== Power spectrum of CAZAC sequence ==
The power spectrum of a CAZAC sequence is flat.

If we have a CAZAC sequence the time domain autocorrelation is an impulse

$$r(\tau)=\delta(n)$$

The discrete fourier transform of the autocorrelation is flat

$$R(f) = 1/N$$

Power spectrum is related to autocorrelation by

$$R(f) = \left| X(f) \right|^2$$

As a result the power spectrum is also flat.

$$\left| X(f) \right|^2 = 1/N$$
