= Zadoff–Chu sequence =

Complex-valued mathematical sequence

A Zadoff–Chu (ZC) sequence is a complex-valued mathematical sequence which, when applied to a signal, gives rise to a new signal of constant amplitude. When cyclically shifted versions of a Zadoff–Chu sequence are imposed upon a signal the resulting set of signals detected at the receiver are uncorrelated with one another.

== Description ==
Zadoff–Chu sequences exhibit the useful property that cyclically shifted versions of themselves are orthogonal to one another.

A generated Zadoff–Chu sequence that has not been shifted is known as a root sequence.

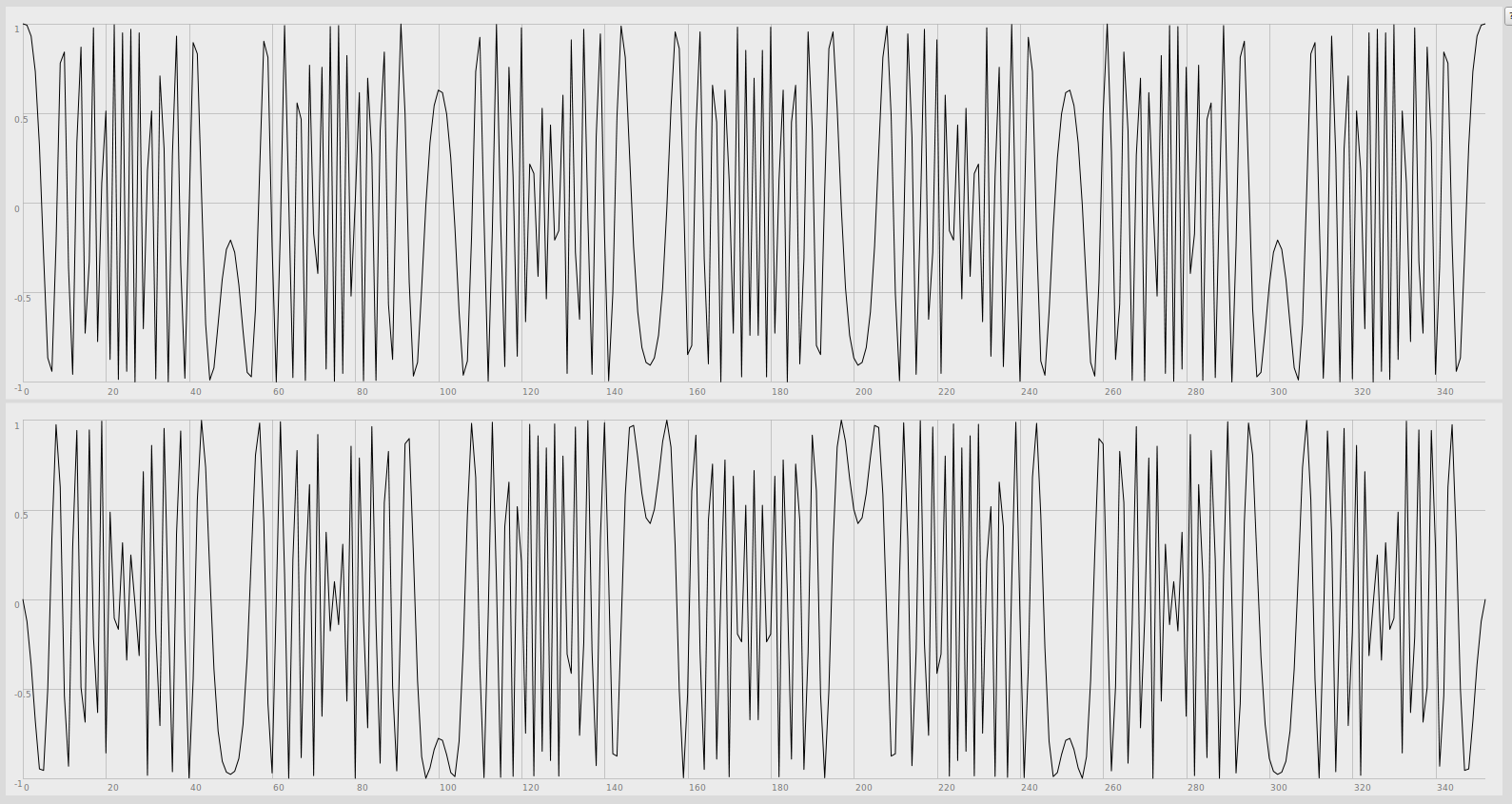
Plot of a Zadoff-Chu sequence for u=7, N=353

The complex value at each position n of each root Zadoff–Chu sequence parameterized by u is given by

$$x_u(n)=\text{exp}\left(-j\frac{\pi un(n+c_\text{f}+2q)}{N_\text{ZC}}\right), \,$$

where

$$0 \le n < N_\text{ZC}$$,

$0 < u < N_\text{ZC}$ and $\text{gcd}(N_\text{ZC},u)=1$,

$$c_\text{f} = N_\text{ZC} \mod 2$$,

$$q \in \Z$$,

$$N_\text{ZC} =  \text{length of sequence}$$.

Zadoff–Chu sequences are CAZAC sequences (constant-amplitude zero-autocorrelation waveform).

Note that the special case $q = 0$ results in a Chu sequence,. Setting $q \neq 0$ produces a sequence that is equal to the cyclically shifted version of the Chu sequence by $q$, and multiplied by a complex, modulus 1 number, where by multiplied we mean that each element is multiplied by the same number.

== Properties of Zadoff-Chu sequences ==
1. They are periodic with period $N_\text{ZC}$.

$$x_u ( n + N_{\text{ZC}} )= x_u(n)$$

2. If $N_\text{ZC}$ is prime, the discrete Fourier transform of a Zadoff–Chu sequence is another Zadoff–Chu sequence conjugated, scaled and time scaled.

$X_{u}[k]= x_{u}^{*}(\tilde{u}k) X_{u}[0]$ where $\tilde{u}$ is the multiplicative inverse of u modulo $N_\text{ZC}$.

3. The auto correlation of a Zadoff–Chu sequence with a cyclically shifted version of itself is zero, i.e., it is non-zero only at one instant which corresponds to the cyclic shift.

4. The cross-correlation between two prime length Zadoff–Chu sequences, i.e. different values of $u, u=u_1, u=u_2$, is constant $1/{\sqrt{N_\text{ZC}}}$, provided that $u_1 - u_2$ is relatively prime to $N_\text{ZC}$.

== Usages ==
Zadoff–Chu sequences are used in the 3GPP Long Term Evolution (LTE) air interface in the Primary Synchronization Signal (PSS), random access preamble (PRACH), uplink control channel (PUCCH), uplink traffic channel (PUSCH) and sounding reference signals (SRS).

By assigning orthogonal Zadoff–Chu sequences to each LTE eNodeB and multiplying their transmissions by their respective codes, the cross-correlation of simultaneous eNodeB transmissions is reduced, thus reducing inter-cell interference and uniquely identifying eNodeB transmissions.

Zadoff–Chu sequences are an improvement over the Walsh–Hadamard codes used in UMTS because they result in a constant-amplitude output signal, reducing the cost and complexity of the radio's power amplifier.

== See also ==
- Polyphase sequence
