= Maximum-length sequence =

Type of pseudorandom binary sequence

A maximum-length sequence (MLS) is a type of pseudorandom binary sequence.

They are bit sequences generated using maximal linear-feedback shift registers and are so called because they are periodic and reproduce every binary sequence (except the zero vector) that can be represented by the shift registers (i.e., for length-m registers they produce a sequence of length 2^{m} − 1). An MLS is also sometimes called an n-sequence or an m-sequence. MLSs are spectrally flat, with the exception of a near-zero DC term.

These sequences may be represented as coefficients of primitive polynomials in a polynomial ring over Z/2Z.

Practical applications for MLS include measuring impulse responses (e.g., of room reverberation or arrival times from towed sources in the ocean). They are also used as a basis for deriving pseudo-random sequences in digital communication systems that employ direct-sequence spread spectrum and frequency-hopping spread spectrum transmission systems, and in the efficient design of some fMRI experiments.

== Generation ==
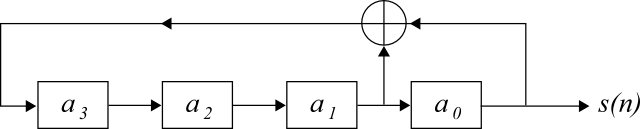
Figure 1: The next value of register a_{3} in a feedback shift register of length 4 is determined by the modulo-2 sum of a_{0} and a_{1}.

MLS are generated using maximal linear-feedback shift registers. An MLS-generating system with a shift register of length 4 is shown in Fig. 1. It can be expressed using the following recursive relation:

$$\begin{cases}
a_3[n+1] = a_0[n] + a_1[n]\\
a_2[n+1] = a_3[n] \\
a_1[n+1] = a_2[n] \\
a_0[n+1] = a_1[n]
\end{cases}$$

where n is the time index and $+$ represents modulo-2 addition. For bit values 0 = FALSE or 1 = TRUE, this is equivalent to the XOR operation.

As MLS are periodic and shift registers cycle through every possible binary value (with the exception of the zero vector), registers can be initialized to any state, with the exception of the zero vector.

=== Polynomial interpretation ===
A polynomial over GF(2) can be associated with the linear-feedback shift register. It has degree of the length of the shift register, and has coefficients that are either 0 or 1, corresponding to the taps of the register that feed the xor gate. For example, the polynomial corresponding to Figure 1 is $x^4+x+1$.

A necessary and sufficient condition for the sequence generated by a LFSR to be maximal length is that its corresponding polynomial be primitive.

=== Implementation ===
MLS are inexpensive to implement in hardware or software, and relatively low-order feedback shift registers can generate long sequences; a sequence generated using a shift register of length 20 is 2^{20} − 1 samples long (1,048,575 samples).

== Properties of maximum-length sequences ==
MLS have the following properties, as formulated by Solomon Golomb.

=== Balance property ===
The occurrence of 0 and 1 in the sequence should be approximately the same. More precisely, in a maximum-length sequence of length $2^n-1$ there are $2^{n-1}$ ones and $2^{n-1}-1$ zeros. The number of ones equals the number of zeros plus one, since the state containing only zeros cannot occur.

=== Run property ===
A "run" is a sub-sequence of consecutive "1"s or consecutive "0"s within the MLS concerned. The number of runs is the number of such sub-sequences.

Of all the "runs" (consisting of "1"s or "0"s) in the sequence :

- One half of the runs are of length 1.
- One quarter of the runs are of length 2.
- One eighth of the runs are of length 3.
- ... etc. ...

=== Correlation property ===
The circular autocorrelation of an MLS is a Kronecker delta function (with DC offset and time delay, depending on implementation). For the ±1 convention, i.e., bit value 1 is assigned $s = +1$ and bit value 0 $s = -1$, mapping XOR to the negative of the product:

$$R(n)=\frac 1 N \sum_{m=1}^N s[m]\, s^*[m+n]_N = \begin{cases}
1 &\text{if } n = 0,   \\
-\frac 1 N &\text{if } 0 < n < N.   \end{cases}$$

where $s^*$ represents the complex conjugate and $[m+n]_N$ represents a circular shift.

The linear autocorrelation of an MLS approximates a Kronecker delta.

== Extraction of impulse responses ==
If a linear time invariant (LTI) system's impulse response is to be measured using a MLS, the response can be extracted from the measured system output y[n] by taking its circular cross-correlation with the MLS. This is because the autocorrelation of a MLS is 1 for zero-lag, and nearly zero (−1/N where N is the sequence length) for all other lags; in other words, the autocorrelation of the MLS can be said to approach unit impulse function as MLS length increases.

If the impulse response of a system is h[n] and the MLS is s[n], then

$$y[n] = (h*s)[n].\,$$

Taking the cross-correlation with respect to s[n] of both sides,

$$\varphi_{sy} = h[n]*\varphi_{ss}\,$$

and assuming that φ_{ss} is an impulse (valid for long sequences)

$$h[n] = \varphi_{sy}.\,$$

Any signal with an impulsive autocorrelation can be used for this purpose, but signals with high crest factor, such as the impulse itself, produce impulse responses with poor signal-to-noise ratio. It is commonly assumed that the MLS would then be the ideal signal, as it consists of only full-scale values and its digital crest factor is the minimum, 0 dB. However, after analog reconstruction, the sharp discontinuities in the signal produce strong intersample peaks, degrading the crest factor by 4-8 dB or more, increasing with signal length, making it worse than a sine sweep. Other signals have been designed with minimal crest factor, though it is unknown if it can be improved beyond 3 dB.

== Relationship to Hadamard transform ==
Cohn and Lempel showed the relationship of the MLS to the Hadamard transform. This relationship allows the correlation of an MLS to be computed in a fast algorithm similar to the FFT.

== See also ==
- Barker code
- Complementary sequences
- Federal Standard 1037C
- Frequency response
- Gold code
- Impulse response
- Polynomial ring
