= Kasami code =

Mathematical sequences

Kasami sequences, named after Japanese information theorist Tadao Kasami, are binary sequences of length 2^{N}−1 where N is an even integer. Kasami sequences have good cross-correlation values approaching the Welch lower bound. They are used as low-correlation spreading sequences in spread-spectrum communication systems. There are two classes of Kasami sequences—the small set and the large set.

== Kasami Set ==
The process of generating a Kasami sequence is initiated by generating a maximum length sequence a(n), where n = 1…2^{N}−1. Maximum length sequences are periodic sequences with a period of exactly 2^{N}−1. Next, a secondary sequence is derived from the initial sequence via cyclic decimation sampling as b(n) = a(q ⋅ n), where q = 2^{N/2}+1. Modified sequences are then formed by adding a(n) and cyclically time shifted versions of b(n) using modulo-two arithmetic, which is also termed the exclusive or (xor) operation. Computing modified sequences from all 2^{N/2} unique time shifts of b(n) forms the Kasami set of code sequences.

== See also ==
- Gold sequence (aka Gold code)
- JPL sequence (aka JPL code)
