= Hypergraph regularity method =

Mathematical method in extremal graph theory

In mathematics, the hypergraph regularity method is a powerful tool in extremal graph theory that refers to the combined application of the hypergraph regularity lemma and the associated counting lemma. It is a generalization of the graph regularity method, which refers to the use of Szemerédi's regularity and counting lemmas.

Very informally, the hypergraph regularity lemma decomposes any given $k$-uniform hypergraph into a random-like object with bounded parts (with an appropriate boundedness and randomness notions) that is usually easier to work with. On the other hand, the hypergraph counting lemma estimates the number of hypergraphs of a given isomorphism class in some collections of the random-like parts. This is an extension of Szemerédi's regularity lemma that partitions any given graph into bounded number parts such that edges between the parts behave almost randomly. Similarly, the hypergraph counting lemma is a generalization of the graph counting lemma that estimates number of copies of a fixed graph as a subgraph of a larger graph.

There are several distinct formulations of the method, all of which imply the hypergraph removal lemma and a number of other powerful results, such as Szemerédi's theorem, as well as some of its multidimensional extensions. The following formulations are due to V. Rödl, B. Nagle, J. Skokan, M. Schacht, and Y. Kohayakawa, for alternative versions see Tao (2006), and Gowers (2007).

== Definitions ==
In order to state the hypergraph regularity and counting lemmas formally, we need to define several rather technical terms to formalize appropriate notions of pseudo-randomness (random-likeness) and boundedness, as well as to describe the random-like blocks and partitions.

Notation

- $K_j^{(k)}$ denotes a $k$-uniform clique on $j$ vertices.
- $\mathcal{G}^{(j)}$ is an $l$-partite $j$-graph on vertex partition $\mathcal{G}^{(1)} = V_1 \sqcup \ldots \sqcup V_l$.
- $\mathcal{K}_j(\mathcal{G}^{(i)})$ is the family of all $j$-element vertex sets that span the clique $K_j^{(i)}$ in $\mathcal{G}^{(i)}$. In particular, $\mathcal{K}_j(\mathcal{G}^{(1)}) = K_l^{(j)}(V_1, \ldots, V_l)$ is a complete $l$-partite $j$-graph.

The following defines an important notion of relative density, which roughly describes the fraction of $j$-edges spanned by $(j-1)$-edges that are in the hypergraph. For example, when $j=3$, the quantity $d(\mathcal{G}^{(3)} \vert \mathbf{Q}^{(2)})$ is equal to the fraction of triangles formed by 2-edges in the subhypergraph that are 3-edges.

Definition [Relative density]. For $j \geq 3$, fix some classes $V_{i_1}, \ldots, V_{i_j}$ of $\mathcal{G}^{(1)}$ with $1 \leq i_1 < \ldots < i_j \leq l$. Suppose $r \geq 1$ is an integer. Let $\mathbf{Q}^{(j-1)} = \{ Q_1^{(j-1)}, \ldots, Q_r^{(j-1)} \}$ be a subhypergraph of the induced $j$-partite graph $\mathcal{G}^{(j-1)}[V_{i_1}, \ldots, V_{i_j}]$. Define the relative density $d\left(\mathcal{G}^{(j)} \vert \mathbf{Q}^{(j-1)}\right) = \frac{\left|\mathcal{G}^{(j)} \cap \cup_{s \in [r]} \mathcal{K}_j(Q_s^{j-1})\right|}{\left|\cup_{s \in [r]} \mathcal{K}_j(Q_s^{j-1})\right|}$.

What follows is the appropriate notion of pseudorandomness that the regularity method will use. Informally, by this concept of regularity, $(j-1)$-edges ($\mathcal{G}^{(j-1)}$) have some control over $j$-edges ($\mathcal{G}^{(j)}$). More precisely, this defines a setting where density of $j$ edges in large subhypergraphs is roughly the same as one would expect based on the relative density alone. Formally,

Definition [($\delta_j, d_j, r$)-regularity]. Suppose $\delta_j, d_j$ are positive real numbers and $r \geq 1$ is an integer. $\mathcal{G}^{(j)}$ is ($\delta_j, d_j, r$)-regular with respect to $\mathcal{G}^{(j-1)}$ if for any choice of classes $V_{i_1}, \ldots, V_{i_j}$ and any collection of subhypergraphs $\mathbf{Q}^{(j-1)} = \{ Q_1^{(j-1)}, \ldots, Q_r^{(j-1)} \}$ of $\mathcal{G}^{(j-1)}[V_{i_1}, \ldots, V_{i_j}]$ satisfying $\left|\cup_{s \in [r]}\mathcal{K}_j(Q_s)^{(j-1)}\right| \geq \delta_j \left|\mathcal{K}_j(\mathcal{G}^{(j-1)}[V_{i_1}, \ldots, V_{i_j}])\right|$ we have $d(\mathcal{G}^{(j)} \vert \mathbf{Q}^{(j-1)}) = d_j \pm \delta_j$.

Roughly speaking, the following describes the pseudorandom blocks into which the hypergraph regularity lemma decomposes any large enough hypergraph. In Szemerédi regularity, 2-edges are regularized versus 1-edges (vertices). In this generalized notion, $j$-edges are regularized versus $(j-1)$-edges for all $2\leq j\leq h$. More precisely, this defines a notion of regular hypergraph called $(l, h)$-complex, in which existence of $j$-edge implies existence of all underlying $(j-1)$-edges, as well as their relative regularity. For example, if $\{x,y,z\}$ is a 3-edge then $\{x,y\}$,$\{x,z\}$, and $\{y,z\}$ are 2-edges in the complex. Moreover, the density of 3-edges over all possible triangles made by 2-edges is roughly the same in every collection of subhypergraphs.

Definition [$(\delta, \mathbf{d},r)$-regular $(l, h)$-complex]. An $(l,h)$-complex $\mathbf{G}$ is a system $\{\mathcal{G}^{(j)}\}_{j=1}^h$ of $l$-partite $j$ graphs $\mathcal{G}^{(j)}$ satisfying $\mathcal{G}^{(j)} \subset \mathcal{K}_j(\mathcal{G}^{(j-1)})$. Given vectors of positive real numbers $\delta = (\delta_2, \ldots, \delta_h)$, $\mathbf{d} = (d_2, \ldots, d_h)$, and an integer $r \geq 1$, we say $(l, h)$-complex is $(\delta, \mathbf{d},r)$-regular if

- For each $1 \leq i_1 < i_2 \leq l$, $\mathcal{G}^{(2)}[V_{i_1},V_{i_2}]$ is $\delta_2$-regular with density $d_2 \pm \delta_2$.
- For each $3 \leq j \leq h$, $\mathcal{G}^{(j)}$ is ($\delta_j, d_j, r$)-regular with respect to $\mathcal{G}^{(j-1)}$.

The following describes the equitable partition that the hypergraph regularity lemma will induce. A $(\mu, \delta, \mathbf{d}, r)$-equitable family of partition is a sequence of partitions of 1-edges (vertices), 2-edges (pairs), 3-edges (triples), etc. This is an important distinction from the partition obtained by Szemerédi's regularity lemma, where only vertices are being partitioned. In fact, Gowers demonstrated that solely vertex partition can not give a sufficiently strong notion of regularity to imply Hypergraph counting lemma.

Definition [$(\mu, \delta, \mathbf{d}, r)$-equitable partition]. Let $\mu > 0$ be a real number, $r \geq 1$ be an integer, and $\delta = (\delta_2, \ldots, \delta_{k-1})$, $\mathbf{d}=(d_2, \ldots, d_{k-1})$ be vectors of positive reals. Let $\mathbf{a} = (a_1, \ldots, a_{k-1})$ be a vector of positive integers and $V$ be an $n$-element vertex set. We say that a family of partitions $\mathcal{P} = \mathcal{P}(k-1, \mathbf{a}) = \{\mathcal{P}^{(1)}\, \ldots, \mathcal{P}^{(k-1)}\}$ on $V$ is $(\mu, \delta, \mathbf{d}, r)$-equitable if it satisfies the following:

- $\mathcal{P}^{(1)} = \{V_i \colon i \in [a_1]\}$ is equitable vertex partition of $V$. That is $|V_1| \leq \ldots \leq |V_{a_1}| \leq | V_1| + 1$ .
- $\mathcal{P}^{(j)}$ partitions $\mathcal{K}_j(\mathcal{G}^{(1)}) = K_{a_1}^{(j)}(V_1, \ldots, V_{a_1})$ so that if $P_1^{(j-1)}, \ldots, P_j^{(j-1)} \in \mathcal{P}^{(j-1)}$ and $\mathcal{K}_j(\cup_{i=1}^jP_i^{(j-1)}) \neq \emptyset$ then $\mathcal{K}_j(\cup_{i=1}^jP_i^{(j-1)})$ is partitioned into at most $a_j$ parts, all of which are members $\mathcal{P}^{(j)}$.
- For all but at most $\mu n^k$ $k$-tuples $K \in \binom{V}{k}$ there is unique $(\delta, \mathbf{d},r)$-regular $(k, k-1)$-complex $\mathbf{P} = \{P^{(j)}\}_{j=1}^{k-1}$ such that $P^{(j)}$ has as members $\binom{k}{j}$ different partition classes from $\mathcal{P}^{(j)}$ and $K \in \mathcal{K}_k(P^{(k-1)}) \subset \ldots \subset \mathcal{K}_k(P^{(1)})$.

Finally, the following defines what it means for a $k$-uniform hypergraph to be regular with respect to a partition. In particular, this is the main definition that describes the output of hypergraph regularity lemma below.

Definition [Regularity with respect to a partition]. We say that a $k$-graph $\mathcal{H}^{(k)}$ is $(\delta_k, r)$-regular with respect to a family of partitions $\mathcal{P}$ if all but at most $\delta_k n^k$ $k-$edges $K$ of $\mathcal{H}^{(k)}$ have the property that $K \in \mathcal{K}_k(\mathcal{G}^{(1)})$ and if $\mathbf{P} = \{P^{(j)}\}_{j=1}^{k-1}$ is unique $(k, k-1)$-complex for which $K \in \mathcal{K}_k(P^{(k-1)})$, then $\mathcal{H}^{(k)}$ is $(\delta_k, d(\mathcal{H}^{(k)} \vert P^{(k-1)}), r)$ regular with respect to $\mathcal{P}$.

== Statements ==
=== Hypergraph regularity lemma ===
For all positive real $\mu$, $\delta_k$, and functions $r \, \colon \mathbb{N} \times (0, 1]^{k-2} \to \mathbb{N}$, $\delta_j \, \colon (0,1]^{k-j} \to (0,1]$ for $j = 2, \ldots, k-1$ there exists $T_0$ and $n_0$ so that the following holds. For any $k$-uniform hypergraph $\mathcal{H}^{(k)}$ on $n \geq n_0$ vertices, there exists a family of partitions $\mathcal{P} = \mathcal{P}(k-1, \mathbf{a})$ and a vector $\mathbf{d} = (d_2, \ldots, d_{k-1})$ so that, for $r = r(a_1, \mathbf{d})$ and $\mathbf{\delta} = (\delta_2, \ldots, \delta_{k-1})$ where $\delta_j = \delta_j(d_j, \ldots, d_{k-1})$ for all $j$, the following holds.

- $\mathcal{P}$ is a $(\mu, \mathbf{\delta}, \mathbf{d}, r)$-equitable family of partitions and $a_i \leq T_0$ for every $i = 1, \ldots, k-1$.
- $\mathcal{H}^{(k)}$ is $(\delta_k, r)$ regular with respect to $\mathcal{P}$.

=== Hypergraph counting lemma ===
For all integers $2 \leq k \leq l$ the following holds: $\forall \gamma > 0 \; \; \forall d_k > 0 \; \; \exists \delta_k > 0 \;\; \forall d_{k-1} > 0 \; \; \exists \delta_{k-1} > 0 \; \cdots \; \forall d_2 > 0 \; \; \exists \delta_2>0$ and there are integers $r$ and $m_0$ so that, with $\mathbf{d} = (d_2, \ldots, d_k)$, $\delta = (\delta_2, \ldots, \delta_k)$, and $m \geq m_0$,

if $\mathbf{G} = \{ \mathcal{G}^{(j)}\}_{j=1}^k$ is a $(\delta, \mathbf{d}, r)$-regular $(l,k)$ complex with vertex partition $\mathcal{G}^{(1)} = V_1 \cup \cdots \cup V_l$ and $|V_i| = m$, then

$\left|\mathcal{K}_l(\mathcal{G}^{(k)})\right| = (1 \pm \gamma) \prod_{h = 2}^kd_h^{\binom{l}{h}}\times m^l$.

== Applications ==
The main application through which most others follow is the hypergraph removal lemma, which roughly states that given fixed $\mathcal{F}^{(k)}$ and large $\mathcal{H}^{(k)}$ $k$-uniform hypergraphs, if $\mathcal{H}^{(k)}$ contains few copies of $\mathcal{F}^{(k)}$, then one can delete few hyperedges in $\mathcal{H}^{(k)}$ to eliminate all of the copies of $\mathcal{F}^{(k)}$. To state it more formally,

=== Hypergraph removal lemma ===
For all $l \geq k \geq 2$ and every $\mu > 0$, there exists $\zeta > 0$ and $n_0 > 0$ so that the following holds. Suppose $\mathcal{F}^{(k)}$ is a $k$-uniform hypergraph on $l$ vertices and $\mathcal{H}^{(k)}$ is that on $n \geq n_0$ vertices. If $\mathcal{H}^{(k)}$ contains at most $\zeta n^l$ copies of $\mathcal{F}^{(k)}$, then one can delete $\mu n^k$ hyperedges in $\mathcal{H}^{(k)}$ to make it $\mathcal{F}^{(k)}$-free.

One of the original motivations for graph regularity method was to prove Szemerédi's theorem, which states that every dense subset of $\mathbb{Z}$ contains an arithmetic progression of arbitrary length. In fact, by a relatively simple application of the triangle removal lemma, one can prove that every dense subset of $\mathbb{Z}$ contains an arithmetic progression of length 3.

The hypergraph regularity method and hypergraph removal lemma can prove high-dimensional and ring analogues of density version of Szemerédi's theorems, originally proved by Furstenberg and Katznelson. In fact, this approach yields first quantitative bounds for the theorems.

This theorem roughly implies that any dense subset of $\mathbb{Z}^d$ contains any finite pattern of $\mathbb{Z}^d$. The case when $d = 1$ and the pattern is arithmetic progression of length some length is equivalent to Szemerédi's theorem.

==== Furstenberg and Katznelson Theorem ====
Let $T$ be a finite subset of $\mathbb{R}^d$ and let $\delta > 0$ be given. Then there exists a finite subset $C \subset \mathbb{R}^d$ such that every $Z \subset C$ with $|Z| > \delta |C|$ contains a homothetic copy of $T$. (i.e. set of form $z + \lambda T$, for some $z \in \mathbb{R}^d$ and $t \in \mathbb{R}$)

Moreover, if $T \subset [-t; t]^d$ for some $t \in \mathbb{N}$, then there exists $N_0 \in \mathbb{N}$ such that $C = [-N,N]^d$ has this property for all $N \geq N_0$.

Another possible generalization that can be proven by the removal lemma is when the dimension is allowed to grow.

==== Tengan, Tokushige, Rödl, and Schacht Theorem ====
Let $A$ be a finite ring. For every $\delta > 0$, there exists $M_0$ such that, for $M \geq M_0$, any subset $Z \subset A^M$ with $|Z| > \delta |A^M|$ contains a coset of an isomorphic copy of $A$ (as a left $A$-module).

In other words, there are some $\mathbf{r}, \mathbf{u} \in A^M$ such that $r + \varphi(A) \subset Z$, where $\varphi \colon A \to A^M$, $\varphi(a)=a \mathbf{u}$ is an injection.
