= Erdős conjecture on arithmetic progressions =

Property of large sets

Erdős' conjecture on arithmetic progressions, often referred to as the Erdős–Turán conjecture, is a conjecture in arithmetic combinatorics. It states that if the sum of the reciprocals of the members of a set A of positive integers diverges, then A contains arbitrarily long arithmetic progressions.

Formally, the conjecture states that if A is a large set in the sense that

$$\sum_{n\in A} \frac{1}{n} \ =\ \infty,$$

then A contains arithmetic progressions of any given length, meaning that for every positive integer k there are an integer a and a non-zero integer c such that $\{a,a{+}c,a{+}2c,\ldots,a{+}kc\}\subset A$.

== History ==
In 1936, Paul Erdős and Pál Turán made the weaker conjecture that any set of integers with positive natural density contains infinitely many three-term arithmetic progressions. This was proven by Klaus Roth in 1952, and generalized to arbitrarily long arithmetic progressions by Szemerédi in 1975 in what is now known as Szemerédi's theorem.

In a 1976 talk titled "To the memory of my lifelong friend and collaborator Paul Turán," Erdős offered a prize of US$3000 for a proof of this conjecture. In 1996, he raised the prize to US$5000.

== Progress and related results ==
Unsolved problem in mathematics
Does every large set of natural numbers contain arbitrarily long arithmetic progressions?
Reported as unsolved in a source published in.
More unsolved problems in mathematics

Erdős' conjecture on arithmetic progressions can be viewed as a stronger version of Szemerédi's theorem. Because the sum of the reciprocals of the primes diverges, the Green–Tao theorem on arithmetic progressions is a special case of the conjecture.

The weaker claim that A must contain infinitely many arithmetic progressions of length 3 is a consequence of an improved bound in Roth's theorem on arithmetic progressions. A 2016 paper by Thomas Bloom proved that if $A\subset \{1,...,N\}$ contains no non-trivial three-term arithmetic progressions then $|A|\ll N(\log{\log{N}})/\log{N}$. In 2020, a preprint by Bloom and Olof Sisask improved the bound to $|A|\ll N/(\log{N})^{1+c}$ for some absolute constant $c>0$. In 2023, a new bound of $\exp(-c(\log N)^{1/12})N$ was found by computer scientists Zander Kelley and Raghu Meka, with an exposition given in more familiar mathematical language by Bloom and Sisask, who improved the exponent of the Kelly–Meka bound to $\beta=1/9$ and conjectured that $\beta=5/41$ in a preprint.

In 2026, as part of the OpenAI bulk release of mathematical papers, OpenAI released a claimed proof with Lean formalization.

== See also ==
- Problems involving arithmetic progressions
- List of sums of reciprocals
- List of conjectures by Paul Erdős
- Müntz–Szász theorem
