= Induced matching =

Graph theory term

Each set of edges of the same color is an induced matching. Each color is a matching because none of these edges share a vertex, and is an induced subgraph because there are no edges of a different color directly connecting 2 vertices belonging to it. The minimum number of colors (induced matchings) needed to cover the graph is the graph's strong chromatic index.

In graph theory, an induced matching or strong matching is a subset of the edges of an undirected graph that do not share any vertices (it is a matching) and these are the only edges connecting any two vertices which are endpoints of the matching edges (it is an induced subgraph).

An induced matching can also be described as an independent set in the square of the line graph of the given graph.

== Strong coloring and neighborhoods ==
3 colors are needed to cover cycles divisible by 3, and 4 are needed otherwise.

The minimum number of induced matchings into which the edges of a graph $G$ can be partitioned is called its strong chromatic index, denoted $\chi_s'(G)$, by analogy with the chromatic index $\chi'(G)$ of the graph, the minimum number of matchings into which its edges can be partitioned. It equals the chromatic number of the square of the line graph. Brooks' theorem, applied to the square of the line graph, shows that the strong chromatic index is at most quadratic in the maximum degree of the given graph, but better constant factors in the quadratic bound can be obtained by other methods.

The Ruzsa–Szemerédi problem concerns the edge density of balanced bipartite graphs with linear strong chromatic index. Equivalently, it concerns the density of a different class of graphs, the locally linear graphs in which the neighborhood of every vertex is an induced matching. Neither of these types of graph can have a quadratic number of edges, but constructions are known for graphs of this type with nearly-quadratic numbers of edges.

== Computational complexity ==
Finding an induced matching of size at least $k$ is NP-complete (and thus, finding an induced matching of maximum size is NP-hard). It can be solved in polynomial time in chordal graphs, because the squares of line graphs of chordal graphs are perfect graphs. Moreover, it can be solved in linear time in chordal graphs. Unless an unexpected collapse in the polynomial hierarchy occurs, the largest induced matching cannot be approximated to within any $n^{1-\varepsilon}$ approximation ratio in polynomial time.

The problem is also W[1]-hard, meaning that even finding a small induced matching of a given size $k$ is unlikely to have an algorithm significantly faster than the brute force search approach of trying all $k$-tuples of edges. However, the problem of finding $k$ vertices whose removal leaves an induced matching is fixed-parameter tractable. The problem can also be solved exactly on $n$-vertex graphs in time $O(1.3752^n)$ with exponential space, or in time $O(1.4231^n)$ with polynomial space.

== See also ==
- Induced path
