= Problems involving arithmetic progressions =

Subset of mathematical connundrums

Problems involving arithmetic progressions are of interest in number theory, combinatorics, and computer science, both from theoretical and applied points of view.

== Largest progression-free subsets ==
Find the cardinality (denoted by A_{k}(m)) of the largest subset of {1, 2, ..., m} which contains no progression of k distinct terms. The elements of the forbidden progressions are not required to be consecutive. For example, A_{4}(10) = 8, because {1, 2, 3, 5, 6, 8, 9, 10} has no arithmetic progressions of length 4, while all 9-element subsets of {1, 2, ..., 10} have one.

In 1936, Paul Erdős and Pál Turán posed a question related to this number and Erdős set a $1000 prize for an answer to it. The prize was collected by Endre Szemerédi for a solution published in 1975, what has become known as Szemerédi's theorem.

== Arithmetic progressions from prime numbers ==
Szemerédi's theorem states that a set of natural numbers of non-zero upper asymptotic density contains finite arithmetic progressions, of any arbitrary length k.

Erdős made a more general conjecture from which it would follow that

The sequence of primes numbers contains arithmetic progressions of any length.

This result was proven by Ben Green and Terence Tao in 2004 and is now known as the Green–Tao theorem.

See also Dirichlet's theorem on arithmetic progressions.

As of 2020, the longest known arithmetic progression of primes has length 27:

224584605939537911 + 81292139·23#·n, for n = 0 to 26. (23# = 223092870)

As of 2011, the longest known arithmetic progression of consecutive primes has length 10. It was found in 1998. The progression starts with a 93-digit number

100 99697 24697 14247 63778 66555 87969 84032 95093 24689
19004 18036 03417 75890 43417 03348 88215 90672 29719

and has the common difference 210.

== Primes in arithmetic progressions ==
The prime number theorem for arithmetic progressions deals with the asymptotic distribution of prime numbers in an arithmetic progression.

== Covering by and partitioning into arithmetic progressions ==
- Find minimal l_{n} such that any set of n residues modulo p can be covered by an arithmetic progression of the length l_{n}.
- For a given set S of integers find the minimal number of arithmetic progressions that cover S
- For a given set S of integers find the minimal number of nonoverlapping arithmetic progressions that cover S
- Find the number of ways to partition {1, ..., n} into arithmetic progressions.
- Find the number of ways to partition {1, ..., n} into arithmetic progressions of length at least 2 with the same period.
- See also Covering system

== See also ==
- Arithmetic combinatorics
- PrimeGrid
