= Gábor N. Sárközy =

Gábor N. Sárközy, also known as Gabor Sarkozy, is a Hungarian-American mathematician, the son of noted mathematician András Sárközy. He is currently on faculty of the Computer Science Department at Worcester Polytechnic Institute, MA, United States and is also a senior research fellow at the Alfréd Rényi Institute of Mathematics of the Hungarian Academy of Sciences.

He obtained a diploma in mathematics from Eötvös Loránd University and a PhD in computer science from Rutgers, under the advisement of Endre Szemerédi. Perhaps his best known result is the Blow-up lemma, in which, together with János Komlós and Endre Szemerédi he proved that the regular pairs in Szemerédi regularity lemma behave like complete bipartite graphs under the correct conditions. The lemma allowed for deeper exploration into the nature of embeddings of large sparse graphs into dense graphs. A hypergraph variant was developed later by Peter Keevash.

He is member of the editorial board of the European Journal of Combinatorics.

He also has an Erdős number of 1.
