= Vitaly Bergelson =

Mathematician at Ohio State University

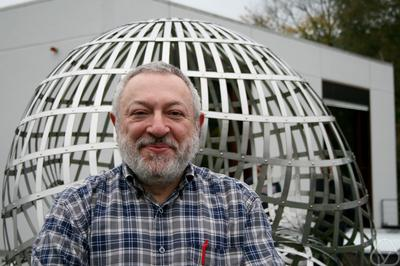
- Vitaly Bergelson
- Born: 1950 (age 75–76); Kiev
- Education: Hebrew University of Jerusalem
- Known for: Polynomial generalization of Szemerédi's theorem
- Awards: Fellow of the American Mathematical Society (2012)
- Scientific career
- Fields: Mathematics
- Workplaces: Ohio State University
- Doctoral advisor: Hillel Furstenberg

Vitaly Bergelson (born 1950 in Kiev) is a mathematical researcher and professor at Ohio State University in Columbus, Ohio. His research focuses on ergodic theory and combinatorics.

Bergelson received his Ph.D. in 1984 under Hillel Furstenberg at the Hebrew University of Jerusalem. He gave an invited address at the International Congress of Mathematicians in 2006 in Madrid. Among Bergelson's best known results is a polynomial generalization of Szemerédi's theorem. The latter provided a positive solution to the famous Erdős–Turán conjecture from 1936 stating that any set of integers of positive upper density contains arbitrarily long arithmetic progressions. In a 1996 paper Bergelson and Leibman obtained an analogous statement for "polynomial progressions". The Bergelson-Leibman theorem and the techniques developed in its proof spurred significant further applications and generalizations, particularly in the recent work of Terence Tao.

In 2012, he became a fellow of the American Mathematical Society.
