= Dalki (cartoon) =

Korean cartoon character and franchise

Dalki is a Korean cartoon character and children's franchise created by Ssamzie in 1997, akin to Strawberry Shortcake, Hello Kitty, and Miffy from the US, Japan, and Holland respectively. Dalki is the title character of the franchise. She is a troublemaker, but she is often portrayed as having a kind heart and teaching important lessons. Many of the characters in Dalki wear some form of fruit costume. Dalki, which means "strawberry" in Korean, wears a strawberry shaped hat.

A Dalki Theme Park was created in June 2004. It is located in the Heyri Art Valley in Paju, Gyeonggi-do, Korea. A new extension space called "I Like Dalki 2" was set up in 2006, and a book theme park "I’m not going home" was launched in June 2007. There is also an "I like Dalki" space at the Kimhae Arts and Sports Center in Gimhae, near the city of Busan.

In April 2010, Ssamzie announced its bankruptcy. The Dalki character division, however, had separated from the main company in October of the previous year and is now under the management of Ureen Nongbu Co. Ltd (주 어린농부).

== Characters ==
Dalki
The title character. A capricious little girl with a unique style.

Banana
A selfish boy with long, yellow hair, Banana is often portrayed as playing music and being somewhat elitist. He is, however, susceptible to loneliness.

Dolbam
A good friend to Subak, Dolbam (chestnut) is considered to be bold and positive. He is afraid of small dogs.

Dongchimee
Dongchimee is a stranger who lives separate from the others. Basically he is a big, yellow man who loves poop. He thinks it is so great that he collects it, makes art from it, and even keeps it on his head at all times. "Ddong" is Korean for "poop" and "chimee" may mean poke or stick. This probably refers to the Korean prank of ddongchim : severe poking in the delicate derriere area.

Lemon
Lemon fills the role of Dalki's good friend. She is known to be a crybaby, and a bit stubborn as well, but she is also philosophical and kind.

Subak
Subak, meaning "watermelon", is the main love interest of Dalki. He is seen as simple, but he is also very popular.
