= Minjungseorim Bobmunsa =

Korean publishing house

- Hangul: 법문사·민중서림
- Hanja: 法文社·民衆書林
- Revised Romanization: Beommunsa Minjung Seorim
- McCune–Reischauer: Pŏmmunsa Minjung Sŏrim

Minjungseorim Bobmunsa, Ltd. is a Korean publishing house company headquartered in Paju Book City, Korea. The company specializes in Korean and foreign dictionaries that it distributes internationally.

Beopmoon Minjoong publishes Korean dictionaries, English dictionaries, short stories, language books, religious books and other foreign dictionaries.

== See also ==
- Korean studies
