= Kim Eun-jung =

Kim Eun-jung is the common Roman-alphabet spelling of two different Korean names.

Also spelled Kim Eun-jeong (Korean: 김은정; RR: Gim Eunjeong; MR: Kim Ŭnjŏng):

- Kim Eun-jung (curler) (born 1990), South Korean curler
- Kim Eun-jung (singer), South Korean singer, member of Jewelry
- Kim Eun-jeong (swimmer) (born 1973), South Korean swimmer
- Kim Un-jong (gymnast), North Korean gymnast, represented North Korea at the 2004 Summer Olympics
- Kim Eun-jung (football coach), coach of the South Korea women's national football team
- Eun Jung Kim (computer scientist), South Korean computer scientist and mathematician

Also spelled Kim Eun-joong (Korean: 김은중; RR: Gim Eunjung; MR: Kim Ŭnjung):

- Kim Eun-jung (footballer) (born 1979), South Korean football player
- Kim Eun-jung (writer) (born 1972), South Korean children's writer

== See also ==
- Kim Jung-eun (born 1976), South Korean actress
