= Dana Ron =

Israeli computer scientist

Dana Ron Goldreich
- דנה רון גולדרייך
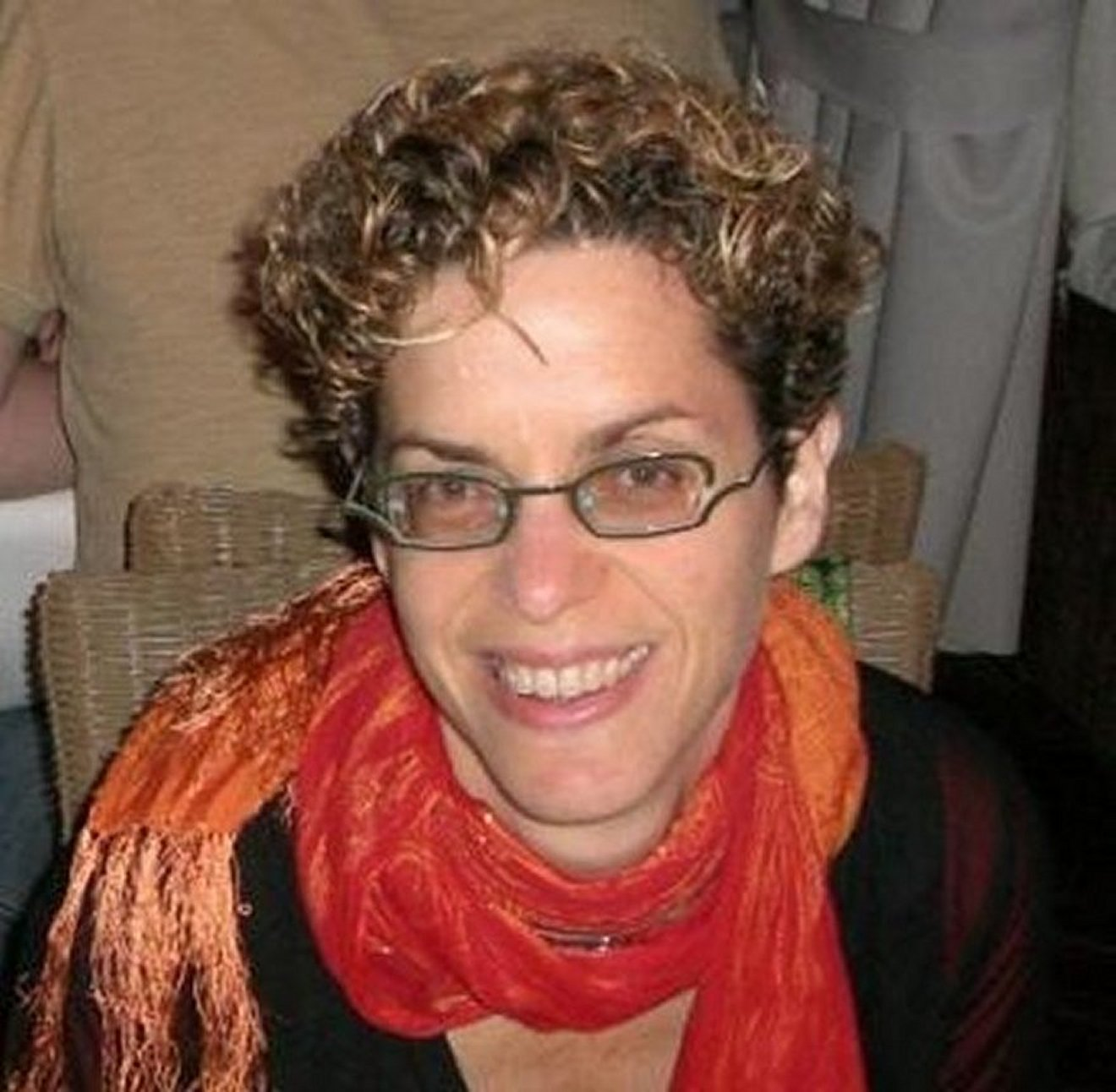
- Dana Ron
- Education: Hebrew University of Jerusalem
- Known for: Property testing
- Spouse: Oded Goldreich
- Scientific career
- Fields: Computer Science
- Workplaces: Tel Aviv University
- Thesis: Automata Learning and its Applications (1995)
- Doctoral advisor: Naftali Tishby
- Doctoral students: Tali Kaufman

Dana Ron Goldreich (Hebrew: דנה רון גולדרייך; born 1964) is a computer scientist, a professor of electrical engineering at the Tel Aviv University, Israel. Prof. Ron is one of the pioneers of research in property testing, and a leading researcher in that area.

== Professional career ==
Dana Ron obtained her B.A. (1987) and M.A. (1989) in computer science from the Hebrew University in Jerusalem. Her Ph.D. (1995), also from the Hebrew University, was in the area of machine learning. Between the years 1995-97 she was an NSF post-doctoral fellow at the Massachusetts Institute of Technology (MIT). She was a Bunting fellow in 1997/8, and the Radcliffe fellow at Harvard University in 2003/4. Her research interests include sublinear-time algorithms (in particular property testing), randomized algorithms, and computational learning theory.

She is married to Oded Goldreich, who is also a computer scientist at the Weizmann Institute, and has collaborated with Goldreich on approximation algorithms.

== Works ==
=== Books ===
- D. Ron. Algorithmic and Analysis Techniques in Property Testing, Foundations and Trends in Theoretical Computer Science: vol. 5, no. 2, pages 73–205, 2009.
- D. Ron. Property Testing: A Learning Theory Perspective, Foundations and Trends in Machine Learning: vol. 1, no. 3, pages 307–402, 2008.

=== Selected publications ===
- N. Alon, S. Dar, M. Parnas, and D. Ron, Testing of Clustering. SIAM Review, vol. 46, no. 2, pages 285–308, 2004.
- O. Goldreich, S. Goldwasser and D. Ron, Property Testing and its connection to Learning and Approximation. Journal of the ACM, vol. 45, no. 4, pages 653–750, July 1998.
- D. Ron, Y. Singer, and N. Tishby, The Power of Amnesia: Learning Probabilistic Automata with Variable Memory Length. Machine Learning, vol. 25, no. 2, pages 117–149, 1996.
