= Gregory Gutin =

British-Israeli computer scientist

- גרגורי גוטין
- Born: 17 January 1957 (age 69)
- Citizenship: British and Israeli
- Education: Tel Aviv University
- Scientific career
- Fields: Theoretical Computer Science and Mathematics
- Workplaces: Brunel University London; Royal Holloway University of London
- Doctoral advisor: Noga Alon
- Doctoral students: Eun Jung Kim

Gregory Z. Gutin (Hebrew: גרגורי גוטין; born 17 January 1957) is a scholar in theoretical computer science and discrete mathematics. He received his PhD in Mathematics in 1993 from Tel Aviv University under the supervision of Noga Alon. Since September 2000 Gutin has been Professor in Computer Science at Royal Holloway, University of London. In 2024 he was appointed Distinguished Scientist at the Shenzhen Institute of Advanced Technology for the period 2024–2026.

Gutin's research interests are in algorithms and complexity, access control, graph theory, game theory and combinatorial optimization.

== Publications ==
- Gutin, G.; Punnen, A. P. (May 2006). The Traveling Salesman Problem and Its Variations. Springer. ISBN 978-0-306-48213-7.
- Bang-Jensen, Jørgen; Gutin, Gregory Z. (December 2008). Digraphs: Theory, Algorithms and Applications. Springer. ISBN 978-1-84800-998-1.
- Bang-Jensen, J.; Gutin, G. (2018). Classes of Directed Graphs. Springer. ISBN 978-3-319-71840-8.

== Awards and honours ==
Gutin was the recipient of the Royal Society Wolfson Research Merit Award in 2014, and the best paper awards at SACMAT 2015, 2016, 2021 and 2022. In January 2017 there was a workshop celebrating Gutin's 60th birthday. In 2017, he became a member of Academia Europaea.
