= Misra–Gries heavy hitters algorithm =

Streaming algorithm

Misra and Gries defined the heavy-hitters problem (though they did not introduce the term heavy-hitters (Note: A number of articles cite Misra-Gries as one of the first to provide a heavy hitters algorithm. For example, see David P. Woodruff's article heavy hitter algorithms in data streams and the article by Pandey et al. on heavy hitters using external memory.)) and described the first algorithm for it in the paper Finding repeated elements. Their algorithm The algorithm extends the Boyer-Moore majority finding algorithm in a significant way.

One version of the heavy-hitters problem is as follows: Given is a bag b of n elements and an integer k ≥ 2. Find the values that occur more than n ÷ k times in b. The Misra-Gries algorithm solves the problem by making two passes over the values in b, while storing at most k values from b and their number of occurrences during the course of the algorithm.

Misra-Gries is one of the earliest streaming algorithms, and it is described below in those terms in section #Summaries.

== Misra–Gries algorithm ==
A bag is like a set in which the same value may occur multiple times. Assume that a bag is available as an array b[0:n – 1] of n elements. In the abstract description of the algorithm, we treat b and its segments also as bags. Henceforth, a heavy hitter of bag b is a value that occurs more than n ÷ k times in it, for some integer k, k≥2.

A k-reduced bag for bag b is derived from b by repeating the following operation until no longer possible: Delete k distinct elements from b. From its definition, a k-reduced bag contains fewer than k different values. The following theorem is easy to prove:

Theorem 1. Each heavy-hitter of b is an element of a k-reduced bag for b.

The first pass of the heavy-hitters computation constructs a k-reduced bag t. The second pass declares an element of t to be a heavy-hitter if it occurs more than n ÷ k times in b. According to Theorem 1, this procedure determines all and only the heavy-hitters. The second pass is easy to program, so we describe only the first pass.

In order to construct t, scan the values in b in arbitrary order, for specificity the following algorithm scans them in the order of increasing indices. Invariant P of the algorithm is that t is a k-reduced bag for the scanned values and d is the number of distinct values in t. Initially, no value has been scanned, t is the empty bag, and d is zero.

P: 0 ≤ i ≤ n $\wedge$
t is a k-reduced bag for b[0:i – 1] $\wedge$
d is the number of distinct values in t $\wedge$ 0 ≤ d < k

Whenever element b[i] is scanned, in order to preserve the invariant: (1) if b[i] is not in t, add it to t and increase d by 1, (2) if b[i] is in t, add it to t but don't modify d, and (3) if d becomes equal to k, reduce t by deleting k distinct values from it and update d appropriately.

algorithm Misra–Gries is
    t, d := { }, 0
    for i from 0 to n-1 do
        if b[i] 
  
    
      
        ∉
      
    
    {\displaystyle \notin }
  
 t then
            t, d:= t ∪ {b[i]}, d+1
        else 
            t, d:= t ∪ {b[i]}, d
        endif
        if d = k then
            Delete k distinct values from t; update d
        endif
    endfor

A possible implementation of t is as a set of pairs of the form (v_{i}, c_{i}) where each v_{i} is a distinct value in t and c_{i} is the number of occurrences of v_{i} in t. Then d is the size of this set. The step "Delete k distinct values from t" amounts to reducing each c_{i} by 1 and then removing any pair (v_{i}, c_{i}) from the set if c_{i} becomes 0.

Using an AVL tree implementation of t, the algorithm has a running time of O(n log k). In order to assess the space requirement, assume that the elements of b can have m possible values, so the storage of a value v_{i} needs O(log m) bits. Since each counter c_{i} may have a value as high as n, its storage needs O(log n) bits. Therefore, for O(k) value-counter pairs, the space requirement is O(k (log n + log m)).

== Summaries ==
In the field of streaming algorithms, the output of the Misra-Gries algorithm in the first pass may be called a summary, and such summaries are used to solve the frequent elements problem in the data stream model. A streaming algorithm makes a small, bounded number of passes over a list of data items called a stream. It processes the elements using at most logarithmic amount of extra space in the size of the list to produce an answer.

The term Misra–Gries summary appears to have been coined by Graham Cormode.
