= Heyri Art Valley =

Coordinates: 37.7923°N 126.6958°E

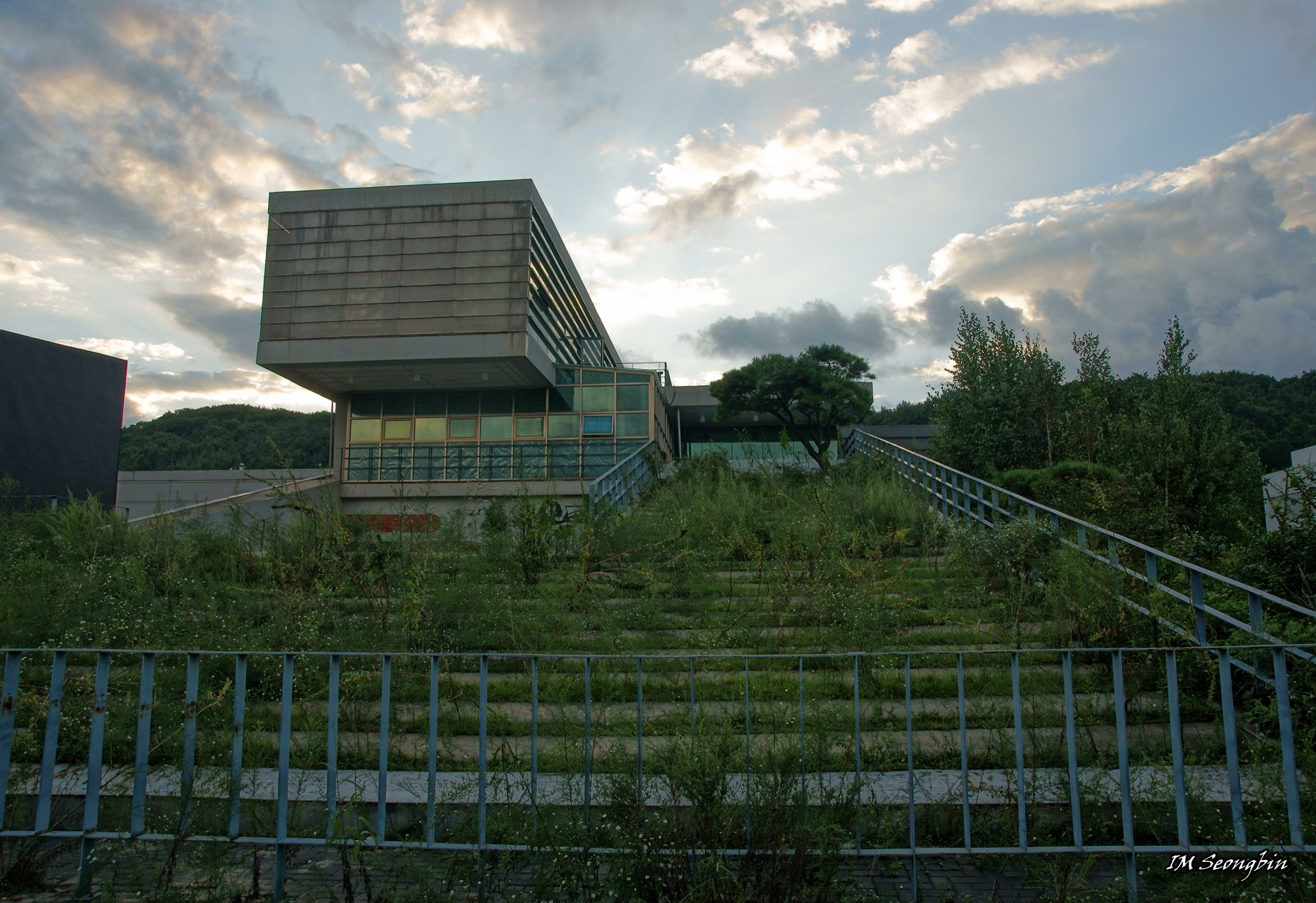
- Art-Service Studio, Heyri
- Interactive map of Heyri Art Valley
- Country: South Korea
- Province: Gyeonggi Province
- Municipality: Paju

Heyri Art Valley (Korean: 헤이리 예술마을) is an artistic community in the unification hill district of Tanhyeon-myeon, Paju, Gyeonggi Province, South Korea. It was constructed by artists, writers, painters and other creatives.

Heyri Art Valley is Korea's largest artistic community with an area of approximately 495,868 square metres (5,337,480 sq ft). In 1997, Heyri was conceived as a planned settlement. It began in 1998 with an inaugural meeting attended by 380 cultural artists. This unique community village integrates concepts that coexist in the fields of production, exhibit, sales, and habitation of cultural art. From a functional perspective, the Heyri Art Valley was planned with an urban form that focused on cultural businesses. It is home to many galleries, museums, exhibit halls, concert halls, small theaters, cafes, restaurants, bookstores, guest houses, art shops, and creative living spaces for artists. Each building was designed by dozens of nationally and internationally renowned architects, who also designed features of the natural landscape, such as mountains, hills, swamps, and brooks. The community derives its name from a traditional Nongyo (farming song), "the sound of Heyri," native to the region.

== History ==
When it was originally conceptualized in 1997, the village was envisioned as a "book village" that would connect to the nearby Paju Book City as part of the Unification Land Development Project. As development began, the village attracted many artists who contributed ideas to expand the initial vision. Their contributions led to the project's transformation into a broader "cultural art Village" which is now known as Heyri Art Valley.

== Space ==
Each building in Heyri serves one or more cultural purposes and often has a theme. For example, there is a Magazine House; on the first floor there is a magazine store, on the second, a cafe that sells coffee and bagels, and on the third floor a magazine history exhibit space. In Heyri, there are no buildings taller than three stories.

The spaces in Heyri meet one or more of the following purposes:

- Creation space: The studios of around 380 cultural artists creating in art, music, video, photography, literature and mediums are located in the Heyri.
- Exhibit space: Many compositions of not only the Heyri's cultural artists but also native and foreign artists are on continuous display here.
- Performance space: A multi-purpose concert hall and outdoor stage for the performing arts comprise this space.
- Festival space: A variety of cultural art festivals are held each year here.
- Education space: Heyri has a cultural art school. There are various fine art instructional institutions here.
- Discussion space: Seminars and lectures for the art, culture, study and idea are conducted in this space.
- Commercial spaces: Many cultural artworks are sold at the Heyri.
- International exchange space: World cultural art lovers visit the Heyri. It also allows many Korean artists to enter the global art market.
- Dwelling spaces: The primary purpose of the Heyri is to provide spaces for artists-in-residence to focus on their work in an ecologically friendly environment.

== Tourism ==
Heyri Art Valley attracts many tourists year round that visit to view the art created there.

=== Access ===
Heyri is located approximately 20 miles northwest of Seoul (approximately 1 hour by public transportation). There is no entry fee to the artistic community; however, some of its spaces may charge admission fees. Most of the spaces are closed on Mondays.

=== Festival ===
There are various festivals of varying sizes held in Heyri throughout the year. Management of events and festivals is handled by Heyri or by the individual cultural spaces that host them.

==== Heyri Pan Art Festival ====
Since 1997, the Pan Art Festival has been the primary festival at Heyri. Various visual art festivals, performance art festivals and participatory events are held each day during the Pan Festival. Art Road 77 is one of the significant parts of Pan Art Festival. Since 2009, Art Road 77 has been an art fair as well as a charity event that donates their sales proceeds to Save the Children.
