= Michael Krivelevich =

Israeli mathematician

- 'מיכאל קריבלביץ
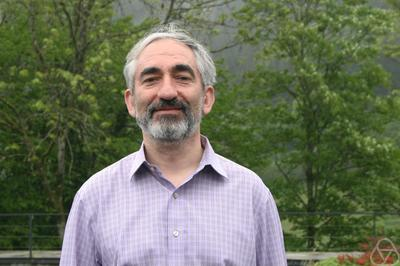
- Krivelvich at Oberwolfach, 2013
- Born: 30 January 1966 (age 60); Kaliningrad, Russian SFSR
- Education: Tel Aviv University
- Known for: Positional games
- Scientific career
- Fields: Mathematics
- Workplaces: Tel Aviv University
- Doctoral advisor: Noga Alon
- Doctoral students: Tali Kaufman

Michael Krivelevich (Hebrew: 'מיכאל קריבלביץ; born January 30, 1966) is a professor with the School of Mathematical Sciences of Tel Aviv University, Israel.

Krivelevich received his PhD from Tel Aviv University in 1997 under the supervision of Noga Alon. He has published extensively in combinatorics and adjacent fields and specializes in extremal and probabilistic combinatorics.

He serves as an editor-in-chief of the Journal of Combinatorial Theory (Series B) and is on the editorial board of several other journals in the field.

== Awards and honors ==
In 2007, Krivelevich and Alan Frieze won the Pazy Memorial Award for research into probabilistic reasoning in combinatorics.

In 2014, Krivelevich gave an invited address in the Combinatorics section at the International Congress of Mathematicians.

He was elected as a member of the 2017 class of Fellows of the American Mathematical Society "for contributions to extremal and probabilistic combinatorics".
