= Tali Kaufman =

Israeli theoretical computer scientist

- טלי קאופמן
- Education: Tel Aviv University
- Known for: Property testing, expander graphs, coding theory, randomized algorithms
- Scientific career
- Fields: Theoretical Computer Science
- Workplaces: Bar-Ilan University
- Doctoral advisor: Noga Alon, Michael Krivelevich, Dana Ron

Tali Kaufman (Hebrew: טלי קאופמן) is an Israeli theoretical computer scientist whose research topics have included property testing, expander graphs, coding theory, and randomized algorithms with sublinear time complexity. She is a professor of computer science at Bar-Ilan University, and a fellow of the Israel Institute for Advanced Studies.

== Education and career ==
Kaufman completed a PhD at Tel Aviv University in 2005, with the dissertation Property Testing of Graphs and Codes, jointly supervised by Noga Alon, Michael Krivelevich, and Dana Ron.

She was a postdoctoral researcher at the Massachusetts Institute of Technology, the Institute for Advanced Study, and the Weizmann Institute of Science, before taking her present position at Bar-Ilan University.

In 2022, she was an invited speaker at the (online) International Congress of Mathematicians.

== Selected publications ==
- Kaufman, Tali; Krivelevich, Michael; Ron, Dana (2004), "Tight bounds for testing bipartiteness in general graphs", SIAM Journal on Computing, 33 (6): 1441–1483, doi:10.1137/S0097539703436424, MR 2112725
- Alon, Noga; Kaufman, Tali; Krivelevich, Michael; Litsyn, Simon; Ron, Dana (2005), "Testing Reed–Muller codes", IEEE Transactions on Information Theory, 51 (11): 4032–4039, Bibcode:2005ITIT...51.4032A, doi:10.1109/TIT.2005.856958, MR 2239019
- Kaufman, Tali; Ron, Dana (2006), "Testing polynomials over general fields", SIAM Journal on Computing, 36 (3): 779–802, doi:10.1137/S0097539704445615, MR 2263012
- Kaufman, Tali; Sudan, Madhu (2008), "Algebraic property testing: the role of invariance", in Dwork, Cynthia (ed.), Proceedings of the 40th Annual ACM Symposium on Theory of Computing, Victoria, British Columbia, Canada, May 17-20, 2008, Association for Computing Machinery, pp. 403–412, doi:10.1145/1374376.1374434
- Dinur, Irit; Kaufman, Tali (2017), "High dimensional expanders imply agreement expanders", in Umans, Chris (ed.), 58th IEEE Annual Symposium on Foundations of Computer Science, FOCS 2017, Berkeley, CA, USA, October 15-17, 2017, IEEE Computer Society, pp. 974–985, doi:10.1109/FOCS.2017.94, ISBN 978-1-5386-3464-6, ECCC TR17-089
- Evra, Shai; Kaufman, Tali; Zémor, Gilles (June 2022), "Decodable quantum LDPC codes beyond the $\sqrt{n}$ distance barrier using high-dimensional expanders", SIAM Journal on Computing, arXiv:2004.07935, doi:10.1137/20m1383689
