= One-pass algorithm =

Type of streaming algorithm

In computing, a one-pass algorithm or single-pass algorithm is a streaming algorithm which reads its input exactly once. It does so by processing items in order, without unbounded buffering; it reads a block into an input buffer, processes it, and moves the result into an output buffer for each step in the process. A one-pass algorithm generally requires O(n) (see 'big O' notation) time and less than O(n) storage (typically O(1)), where n is the size of the input. An example of a one-pass algorithm is the Sondik partially observable Markov decision process.

== Example problems solvable by one-pass algorithms ==
Given any list as an input:

- Count the number of elements.

Given a list of numbers:

- Find the k largest or smallest elements, k given in advance.
- Find the sum, mean, variance and standard deviation of the elements of the list. See also Algorithms for calculating variance.

Given a list of symbols from an alphabet of k symbols, given in advance.

- Count the number of times each symbol appears in the input.
- Find the most or least frequent elements.
- Sort the list according to some order on the symbols (possible since the and after number of symbols is limited).
- Find the maximum gap between two appearances of a given symbol.

== Example problems not solvable by one-pass algorithms ==
Given any list as an input:

- Find the nth element from the end (or report that the list has fewer than n elements).
- Find the middle element of the list. However, this is solvable with two passes: Pass 1 counts the elements and pass 2 picks out the middle one.

Given a list of numbers:

- Find the median.
- Find the modes (This is not the same as finding the most frequent symbol from a limited alphabet).
- Sort the list.
- Count the number of items greater than or less than the mean. However, this can be done in constant memory with two passes: Pass 1 finds the average and pass 2 does the counting.

The two-pass algorithms above are still streaming algorithms but not one-pass algorithms.
