= Mouse flow =

In computer networking, a mouse flow is a short (in total bytes) flow set up by a TCP (or other protocol) flow measured over a network link.

A mouse is a flow with fewer than C packets. An elephant flow is a flow with at least C packets. The constant C is left as a degree of freedom in the analysis. C is chosen depending on the target application.

== See also ==
- Pareto principle
- Elephant flow
