= Yongjugol =

Red-light district in Paju, South Korea

Yongjugol 용주골
- Red-light district
- Interactive map of Yongjugol
- Coordinates: 37°49′45″N 126°50′24″E
- Country: South Korea
- Province: Gyeonggi Province
- City: Paju
- Time zone: UTC+09:00 (Korea Standard Time)

Yongjugol (Korean: 용주골; sometimes Yong Ju Gol, Yongju-gol, or Yongju-Gol) is a red-light district in Paju, Gyeonggi Province, South Korea.

The area first received its reputation around the time of the 1950–1953 Korean War, when it emerged as a kijichon (military base camp town). The practice persisted in the area, despite increasing persecution by the government. As of the early 2020s, the city government has been making vigorous efforts to finally close the district.

== History ==
Yongjugol began as a village that came into being during the Korean War to service members of the United States Army stationed at a nearby military camp whose spending was the sole source of revenue for the village. The military camp, Camp Ross, was just south of Yongjugol and separated the village from Seoul. Once the post-war repatriation of prisoners concluded and until 1955, the 24th Military Police Company (seemingly the divisional MP company of the 24th Infantry Division) worked with other United Nations Command military police in Yongjugol to keep law and order in the area. In 1966, a museum dedicated to the 2nd Infantry Division was opened near Yongjugol, having been relocated there from Fort Benning, Georgia, United States. However, the museum was moved to Camp Casey five years later. In 1980, American soldier Freddie Grant attacked another American soldier with a straight razor outside a Yongjugol nightclub and was subsequently imprisoned in the United States Disciplinary Barracks.

Although it is illegal to engage in prostitution in South Korea, women continue to engage in sex work in Yongjugol through massage parlors, karaoke bars, and kissing rooms. In 2006, South Korea's Minister of Gender Equality and Family Jang Ha-jin called Yongjugol "the heart of prostitution" in Korea.

In 2022, the city allocated a budget for assisting former sex workers, with eligibility of up to two years of benefits. This was part of an overall effort to put an end to sex work in the area, especially as it was the last red-light district in the city. In September 2023, it was reported that the city was deep in the process of ending the district, with dozens of buildings manually inspected, orders to demolish buildings issued, and legal cases filed. By this point, it was reported that there were still around 50 brothels and 200 workers in the area.
