= Uri Zwick =

Israeli computer scientist and mathematician

- אורי צוויק
- Education: Technion – Israel Institute of Technology, Tel Aviv University
- Known for: Graph algorithms, Karloff–Zwick algorithm, Color-coding technique, Block-stacking problem
- Awards: David P. Robbins Prize (2011)
- Scientific career
- Fields: Computer science, Mathematics
- Institutions: Tel Aviv University
- Doctoral advisor: Noga Alon

Uri Zwick (Hebrew: אורי צוויק) is an Israeli computer scientist and mathematician known for his work on graph algorithms, in particular on distances in graphs and on the color-coding technique for subgraph isomorphism. With Howard Karloff, he is the namesake of the Karloff–Zwick algorithm for approximating the MAX-3SAT problem of Boolean satisfiability. He and his coauthors won the David P. Robbins Prize in 2011 for their work on the block-stacking problem.

Zwick earned a bachelor's degree from the Technion – Israel Institute of Technology, and completed his doctorate at Tel Aviv University in 1989 under the supervision of Noga Alon. He is currently a professor of computer science at Tel Aviv University.
