= Kim Eun-jung (writer) =

South Korean children's writer

- Born: 1972 (age 53–54); Paju, Gyeonggi Province
- Occupation: Children's writer
- Awards: Kim Man-jung Literary Prize, 2010; 9th Pureun Literary Prize, 2011

Korean name
- Hangul: 김은중
- RR: Gim Eunjung
- MR: Kim Ŭnjung

Kim Eun-jung (born 1972), also spelled Kim Eun-joong, is a South Korean children's books writer.

== Career ==
Kim was born in Paju, Gyeonggi Province in 1972. She won the Kim Man-jung Literary Prize in 2010 for her story The King of Thieves Welcomes a Thief. The following year, she won the 9th Pureun Literary Prize for her story Magic Trick, which was later published in the collection My Childish Father alongside contributions from fellow children's writers Shin Hye-young, Ha Eun-yu, and Kim Sun-young. Kim's next book, released in December 2011, was about a young protagonist Daepungi and his efforts to earn enough money to buy a video game console, and the conflict with his mother that results. The following year she released another novel aimed at pre-teens, The Day He Didn't Want To Write a Book Report, which was reviewed by the Busan Ilbo. Her most recent book, Special Mission! Let's Protect Ieodo, discusses the marine research station on the disputed island of Ieodo and encourages the young readers to take an interest in it.

== Works ==
Note: English titles are unofficial translations only

- The King of Thieves Welcomes a Thief [도둑왕이 도둑맞은 것]. 2010.
- What Day Is It? [무슨 날이에요?]. Seoul: Daekyo Books [대교출판], February 2011. ISBN 9788939527959.
- The Great Devil King Kang Yu-ri [잘난 척 대마왕 강유리]. Seoul: Blue Garden Books, April 2011. ISBN 9788994813035.
- Magic Trick [마법을 부르는 마술]. In My Childish Father: 9th Pureun Literary Prize Children's Stories Collection [나의 철부지 아빠: 제9회 푸른문학상 동화집]. Seoul: Pureun Books, November 2011. ISBN 9788957982990.
- The White Monster Goes Thud-Thud-Thud [하얀 괴물이 쿵쿵쿵]. Seoul: Daekyo Books [대교출판], September 2011. ISBN 9788939527829.
- Give Me My Money [돈조아마녀님, 내 돈 주세요]. Seoul: Blue Garden Books [파란정원], December 2011. ISBN 9788994813097.
- The Day He Didn't Want to Write a Book Report [독후감 쓰기 싫은 날]. Paju: Gimm-Young Publishers, Inc. [김영사]. December 2012. ISBN 9788934959687.
- Special Mission! Let's Protect Ieodo [특명! 이어도를 지켜라]. Seoul: Sangsuri, November 2013. ISBN 9791155710715.
