= Rainbow coloring =

Path on an edge-colored graph over which no color repeats

Rainbow coloring of a wheel graph, with three colors. Every two non-adjacent vertices can be connected by a rainbow path, either directly through the center vertex (bottom left) or by detouring around one triangle to avoid a repeated edge color (bottom right).

In graph theory, a path in an edge-colored graph is said to be rainbow if no color repeats on it. A graph is said to be rainbow-connected (or rainbow colored) if there is a rainbow path between each pair of its vertices. If there is a rainbow shortest path between each pair of vertices, the graph is said to be strongly rainbow-connected (or strongly rainbow colored).

== Definitions and bounds ==
The rainbow connection number of a graph $G$ is the minimum number of colors needed to rainbow-connect $G$, and is denoted by $\text{rc}(G)$. Similarly, the strong rainbow connection number of a graph $G$ is the minimum number of colors needed to strongly rainbow-connect $G$, and is denoted by $\text{src}(G)$. Clearly, each strong rainbow coloring is also a rainbow coloring, while the converse is not true in general.

It is easy to observe that to rainbow-connect any connected graph $G$, we need at least $\text{diam}(G)$ colors, where $\text{diam}(G)$ is the diameter of $G$ (i.e. the length of the longest shortest path). On the other hand, we can never use more than $m$ colors, where $m$ denotes the number of edges in $G$. Finally, because each strongly rainbow-connected graph is rainbow-connected, we have that $\text{diam}(G) \leq \text{rc}(G) \leq \text{src}(G) \leq m$.

The following are the extremal cases:

- $\text{rc}(G) = \text{src}(G) = 1$ if and only if $G$ is a complete graph.
- $\text{rc}(G) = \text{src}(G) = m$ if and only if $G$ is a tree.

The above shows that in terms of the number of vertices, the upper bound $\text{rc}(G) \leq n - 1$ is the best possible in general. In fact, a rainbow coloring using $n - 1$ colors can be constructed by coloring the edges of a spanning tree of $G$ in distinct colors. The remaining uncolored edges are colored arbitrarily, without introducing new colors. When $G$ is 2-connected, we have that $\text{rc}(G) \leq \lceil n/2 \rceil$. Moreover, this is tight as witnessed by e.g. odd cycles. For every bridgeless graph $G$ with radius $r$, $rc(G)\le r(r+2)$.

The very strong rainbow connection number ($vsrc(G)$) is the minimum number of colors required to color the edges of a graph $G$ such that every shortest path between any two vertices is a rainbow path. While approximating $vsrc(G)$ for a general graph $G$ is an NP-hard problem, it can be solved in polynomial time for certain graph classes, such as cactus graphs.

== Exact rainbow or strong rainbow connection numbers ==
The rainbow or the strong rainbow connection number has been determined for some structured graph classes:

- $\text{rc}(C_n) = \text{src}(C_n) = \lceil n/2 \rceil$, for each integer $n \geq 4$, where $C_n$ is the cycle graph.
- $\text{rc}(W_n) = 3$, for each integer $n \geq 7$, and $\text{src}(W_n) = \lceil n/3 \rceil$, for $n \geq 3$, where $W_n$ is the wheel graph.

== Complexity ==
The problem of deciding whether $\text{rc}(G) = 2$ for a given graph $G$ is NP-complete. Because $\text{rc}(G) = 2$ if and only if $\text{src}(G) = 2$, it follows that deciding if $\text{src}(G) = 2$ is NP-complete for a given graph $G$.

== Variants and generalizations ==
Chartrand, Okamoto and Zhang generalized the rainbow connection number as follows. Let $G$ be an edge-colored nontrivial connected graph of order $n$. A tree $T$ is a rainbow tree if no two edges of $T$ are assigned the same color. Let $k$ be a fixed integer with $2 \leq k \leq n$. An edge coloring of $G$ is called a $k$-rainbow coloring if for every set $S$ of $k$ vertices of $G$, there is a rainbow tree in $G$ containing the vertices of $S$. The $k$-rainbow index $\text{rx}_k(G)$ of $G$ is the minimum number of colors needed in a $k$-rainbow coloring of $G$. A $k$-rainbow coloring using $\text{rx}_k(G)$ colors is called a minimum $k$-rainbow coloring. Thus $\text{rx}_2(G)$ is the rainbow connection number of $G$.

Rainbow connection has also been studied in vertex-colored graphs. This concept was introduced by Krivelevich and Yuster. Here, the rainbow vertex-connection number of a graph $G$, denoted by $\text{rvc}(G)$, is the minimum number of colors needed to color $G$ such that for each pair of vertices, there is a path connecting them whose internal vertices are assigned distinct colors.

== See also ==
- Rainbow matching
