= Lossy Count Algorithm =

The lossy count algorithm is an algorithm to identify elements in a data stream whose frequency exceeds a user-given threshold. The algorithm works by dividing the data stream into buckets for frequent items, but fill as many buckets as possible in main memory one time. The frequency computed by this algorithm is not always accurate, but has an error threshold that can be specified by the user. The run time and space required by the algorithm is inversely proportional to the specified error threshold; hence the larger the error, the smaller the footprint.

The algorithm was created by computer scientists Rajeev Motwani and Gurmeet Singh Manku. It finds applications in computations where data takes the form of a continuous data stream instead of a finite data set, such as network traffic measurements, web server logs, and clickstreams.

== Algorithm ==
The general algorithm is as follows

- Step 1: Divide the incoming data stream into buckets of width $w = 1/\epsilon$, where $\epsilon$ is mentioned by user as the error bound (along with minimum support threshold = $\sigma$).
- Step 2: Increment the frequency count of each item according to the new bucket values. After each bucket, decrement all counters by 1.
- Step 3: Repeat – Update counters and after each bucket, decrement all counters by 1.
