= Eun Jung Kim (computer scientist) =

South Korean computer scientist

Eun Jung Kim (Korean: 김은정) is a South Korean computer scientist and graph theorist specializing in parameterized complexity, parameterized algorithms for constraint satisfaction problems, and width parameters in graphs and matroids. She is an associate professor at KAIST.

== Education and career ==
Kim studied industrial engineering at KAIST in Korea, obtaining a master's degree, and then completed her Ph.D. in computer science in 2010 at Royal Holloway, University of London. Her dissertation was supervised by Gregory Gutin.

After postdoctoral research in Montpellier, France, at the Laboratoire d'Informatique, de Robotique et de Microélectronique de Montpellier, she became a researcher for the French National Centre for Scientific Research (CNRS) in 2011, affiliated with the Laboratoire d'analyse et modélisation de systèmes pour l'aide à la décision (LAMSADE) at Paris Dauphine University. She returned to KAIST as an associate professor in 2024.

== Recognition ==
In 2017, Kim was awarded the CNRS Bronze Medal.
