= Paju Book City =

Industrial complex in Gyeonggi Province, South Korea

Coordinates: 37.706523°N 126.686186°E

Paju Book City 파주출판도시
- Industrial Complex
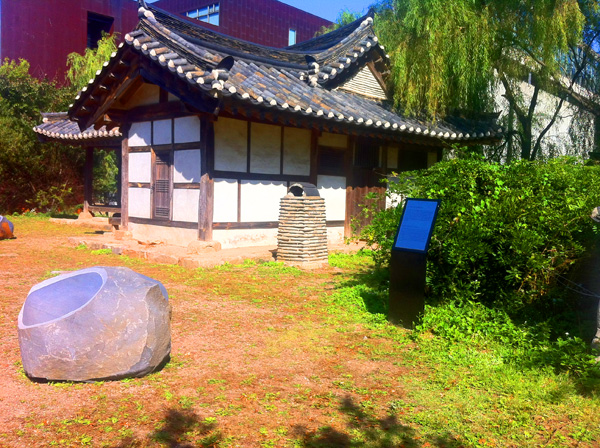
- The hanok at the center of Paju Book City stands a symbol of the City's desire to harmonize with its surroundings.
- Nickname: Book City
- Motto: "A City to Recover Lost Humanity"
- Interactive map of Paju Book City
- Country: South Korea
- Province: Gyeonggi Province
- City: Paju City
- Semi-Autonomous: Paju Book City
- Area: 0.875 km^{2} (0.338 sq mi)
- Time zone: UTC+09:00 (KST)
- Website: www.pajubookcity.org/english/sub_03_01.asp

Paju Book City (Korean: 파주출판도시), located in Gyoha-eup (Paju, Gyeonggi-do), is a cultural complex entirely devoted to the creation, publication, merchandising and sales of Korean books. The "city" belongs to Korea's Ministry of Culture, Sports, and Tourism. Paju Book City is home to 250 publishers with over 10,000 workers. It covers the entire process of publishing from planning to printing and distribution and is home to a large number of book cafes and bookstores.

== Overview ==
Paju Book city is about an hour's drive north of Seoul, and sits directly alongside the 38th Parallel. Approximately 250 companies have offices in this complex which spreads across 215 acres (870,000 m^{2}). These firms employ generate over $1 billion in annual sales. As of the end of 2014, the city will be nearly doubled in size as 300 more publishing and printing companies have plans to move to Paju Book City.

The Daily Telegraph described the role of Paju Book City as:

Korea’s publishing world is concentrated in Paju Book City, an hour’s drive north of Seoul. Inspired by Hay-on-Wye, Paju is a turbocharged version of the town of books. Two hundred publishers jostle in gleaming glass buildings above a plethora of bookshop cafés. At the weekend, I was told, it’s packed with literary-minded Koreans.

Inside Paju Book City books outnumber people by a ratio of 20:1. Korean books are often sold from the ground floor of publishing companies in the city, but there are also several good used bookstores, at least two of which feature books in languages other than Korean. The city also contains unusual art galleries, book cafes, one guesthouse, and specialized exhibition spaces. There is also a playground for children, as well as an adjacent Premium Shopping Outlet.

== History ==
The first plans for Paju Book City were created in 1989 by a group of publisher desiring a model village that would be based solely on the idea of books and their productions, and that this model village would place “common good” above “ruthless self-interest”, as well as be built in harmony with the existing environment of the area.

The Korean government lent support to this plan and in 2001 the foundation as begun for the Asia Publication Culture and Information Centre which has since morphed into approximately 150 buildings containing more than 200 publishing companies.

The development process was unusual, as the desire for "harmony" was placed above the desire for "industrial development." Two different architects were commissioned as 'architectural coordinator' (Min Hyun-Shik and Seung H-Sang). These coordinators worked in concert with UK architect Florian Beigel of the University of North London, as well as more local architects Kim Jong-Kyu and Kim Young-Joon, in preparing an Architectural Guideline for Bookcity. All individual buildings had to be built according to that guideline and the city was divided into sectors, with each sector being given a lead architect. As the official site of Paju Book City notes, "It also was not an easy task to persuade tenants not accustomed to such a process to follow the plans."

Most of Korea's influential publishing companies maintain at least an office in Paju Book City, including MunhakDongne and Chang Bi, the publishers of Kyung-sook Shin, author of Please Look After Mother which won the Man Asian Literary Prize.

Paju has also created its own series of book prizes given to Asian books, writers, designers, publishing companies, and editors “who have dedicated themselves to the development and promotion of Asian publication culture.”

== Events ==
Although events are held at the event center year round, Paju is known for two international festivals. In spring, it is the International Children's Book Festival and in fall it is the annual International Book Festival whose theme is "Booksori", which typically receives nearly half-a million visitors over a 9-day period.

== Awards ==
Best Technology in the Field of Culture Award at the annual Sheik Zayed Book Awards at the Abu Dhabi International Book Fair - 2012
