= Paju =

City in Gyeonggi, South Korea

- Municipal city
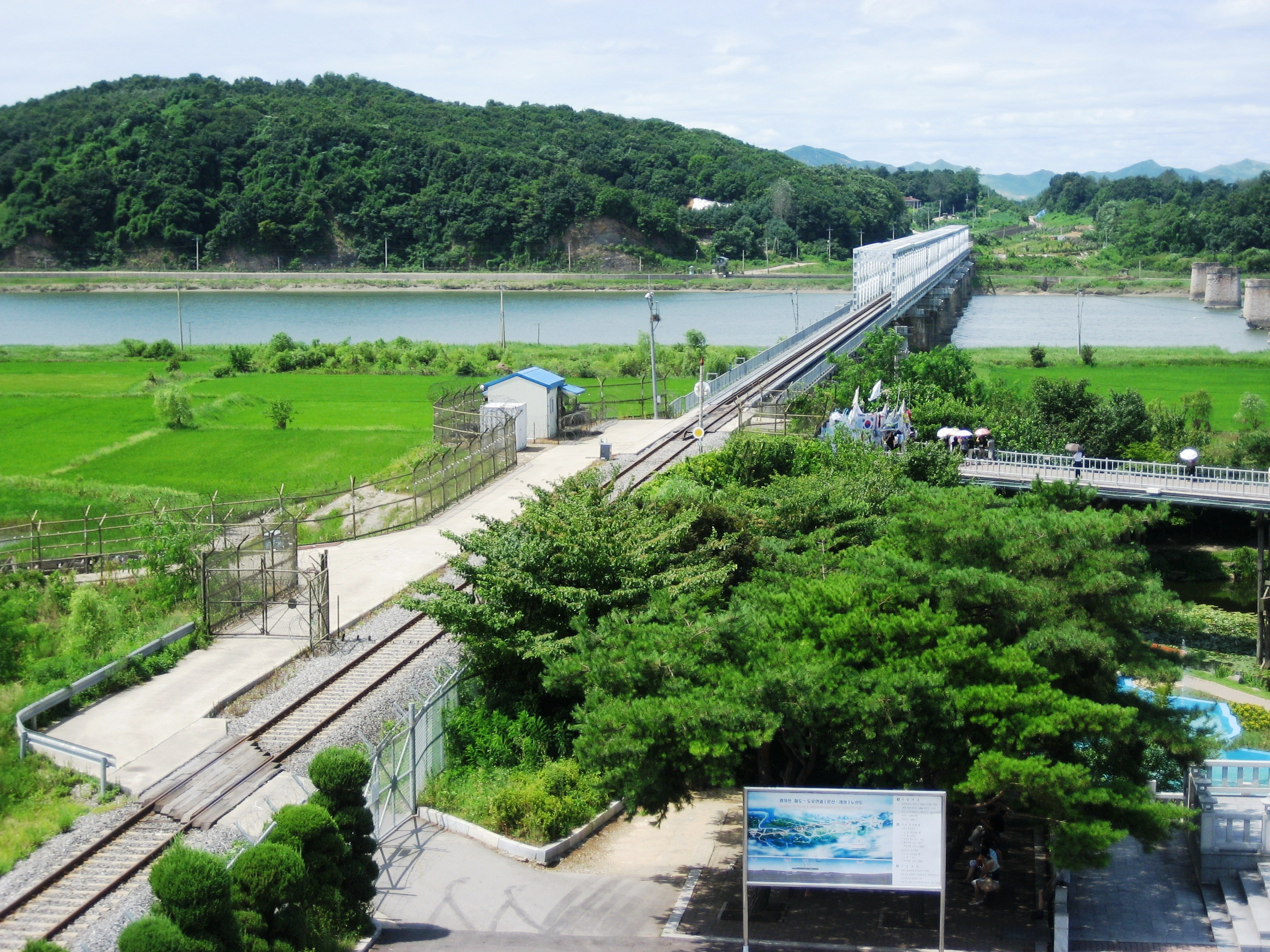
- Rail line crossing the Imjin River

- Flag

- Location in South Korea

- Location within South Korea Location within Korea
- Coordinates: 37°52′N 126°48′E
- Country: South Korea
- Region: Gyeonggi Province (Sudogwon)
- Administrative divisions: 4 eup, 9 myeon, 10 dong

Government
  - Mayor: Son Bae-chan (손배찬)

Area
  - Total: 672.78 km^{2} (259.76 sq mi)

Population (March 2024)
  - Total: 520,803
  - Density: 774.11/km^{2} (2,004.9/sq mi)
  - Dialect: Seoul

Korean name
- Hangul: 파주시
- Hanja: 坡州市
- RR: Paju-si
- MR: P'aju-si

Paju (Korean: 파주; Korean pronunciation: [pʰɐ.d͡ʑu]) is a city in Gyeonggi Province, South Korea. Paju was made a city in 1997; it had previously been a county (gun).

The city area of Paju is 672.78 km^{2} (259.76 sq mi), and it is located just south of Panmunjeom on the 38th parallel. In 2024, the population of Paju was over 501,000. To defend the South Korean capital, Seoul, many U.S. and South Korean Army bases are set up in the area. In 2002, the northernmost South Korean railway station, Dorasan, was opened on the Gyeongui Line. North Korean territory and the city Kaesong can be seen from Paju's mountain Dorasan.

Paju has seen steady residential growth due to its proximity to Seoul. The city is connected to Seoul via the Gyeongui–Jungang Line and several express bus routes, with travel times to central Seoul typically under an hour. These transportation links have contributed to Paju’s development as a commuter city. In addition to residential areas, Paju is home to cultural and tourism sites such as Heyri Art Valley, Paju Book City, and Imjingak Peace Park, attracting both residents and visitors. The city also hosts several large-scale retail complexes, including Shinsegae Paju Premium Outlets and Lotte Premium Outlet Paju Branch, which attract significant foot traffic from nearby regions.

== City symbols ==
=== Cosmos ===
The cosmos is a representative flower that grows during spring in Paju. It has very strong vitality, and symbolizes unity and harmonious life as a citizen of Paju. The flowers have different colors, including pale pink and red.

=== Ginkgo ===
Ginkgos are usually planted as street trees. People can obtain high-quality wood from them. Also, their leaves and fruits are used as a valuable medicine.

=== Pigeon ===
Pigeons are meek and gentle with soft feathers that follow humans well. They symbolize the peace and security of mankind, and they mean to desire the unification of the Korean Peninsula and the well-being of citizens.

=== Badge of Paju ===
The badge brings the look of Paju implicitly. Semiconductors, which symbolize high-tech industry, high-quality culture, and books, and life based on the shape of the rice industry, have represented the badge with the symbol Paju logo.

== Geography ==
Paju has lowlands in the east and west. Many mountains are also located in eastern Paju, forming the border with Yangju. In northern Paju, mountains form the border with Goyang. Moreover, in central Paju, some lower mountains spread towards the south. The major rivers in Paju are the Imjin River and the Han River. The Imjin River flows from the northwest to the west, and the Han River flows in the southwest of Paju.

=== Climate ===
Paju has a monsoon-influenced humid continental climate (Köppen: Dwa) with cold, dry winters and hot, rainy summers. The average annual temperature of Paju is 11 °C, the average January temperature is -4.6 °C and the average temperature is 25 °C in August. Lastly, the annual precipitation of Paju is around 1,300 mm.

Climate data for Paju (2002–2020 normals, extremes 2002–present)
Month	Jan	Feb	Mar	Apr	May	Jun	Jul	Aug	Sep	Oct	Nov	Dec	Year
Record high °C (°F)	13.4 (56.1)	17.4 (63.3)	23.1 (73.6)	32.0 (89.6)	32.0 (89.6)	35.3 (95.5)	36.7 (98.1)	37.6 (99.7)	34.5 (94.1)	29.0 (84.2)	26.1 (79.0)	16.2 (61.2)	37.6 (99.7)
Mean daily maximum °C (°F)	1.8 (35.2)	5.2 (41.4)	11.2 (52.2)	17.9 (64.2)	23.8 (74.8)	27.5 (81.5)	28.8 (83.8)	29.9 (85.8)	26.1 (79.0)	20.3 (68.5)	11.6 (52.9)	3.2 (37.8)	17.3 (63.1)
Daily mean °C (°F)	−4.6 (23.7)	−1.3 (29.7)	4.4 (39.9)	10.8 (51.4)	16.8 (62.2)	21.4 (70.5)	24.2 (75.6)	24.9 (76.8)	19.9 (67.8)	12.6 (54.7)	5.2 (41.4)	−2.6 (27.3)	11.0 (51.8)
Mean daily minimum °C (°F)	−10.6 (12.9)	−7.3 (18.9)	−1.9 (28.6)	4.1 (39.4)	10.7 (51.3)	16.5 (61.7)	20.8 (69.4)	21.2 (70.2)	15.1 (59.2)	6.5 (43.7)	−0.4 (31.3)	−8.0 (17.6)	5.6 (42.1)
Record low °C (°F)	−25.9 (−14.6)	−24.6 (−12.3)	−10.9 (12.4)	−5.0 (23.0)	1.7 (35.1)	9.1 (48.4)	14.3 (57.7)	11.5 (52.7)	4.2 (39.6)	−5.5 (22.1)	−11.1 (12.0)	−20.1 (−4.2)	−25.9 (−14.6)
Average precipitation mm (inches)	17.4 (0.69)	27.9 (1.10)	31.5 (1.24)	74.2 (2.92)	102.0 (4.02)	107.4 (4.23)	395.2 (15.56)	282.9 (11.14)	134.5 (5.30)	50.1 (1.97)	52.7 (2.07)	20.0 (0.79)	1,295.8 (51.02)
Average precipitation days (≥ 0.1 mm)	4.6	5.1	7.0	8.9	8.9	9.9	15.8	14.5	8.4	5.7	8.8	7.4	105
Average relative humidity (%)	65.2	62.7	62.2	63.0	69.6	75.0	84.1	83.5	79.4	74.8	71.4	68.1	71.6
Mean monthly sunshine hours	193.0	184.2	212.4	208.8	234.4	209.1	137.6	171.1	187.5	210.8	163.6	175.8	2,288.3
Source: Korea Meteorological Administration

== Tourist attractions ==
=== Heyri Art Valley ===
Heyri Art Valley is the largest art village in South Korea, and its Korean culture and many genres of art attract visitors. The area includes residences, workrooms, and galleries for artists, museums, and performance spaces designed by artists. It was planned from 1998, and its name, Heyri, is derived from a traditional farming song of Paju. Architects tried to combine the view of nature with the valley when they made plans. The valley hosts art performances appealing to audiences of all ages. The attractive theme brings people to visit every weekend, and more people visit the valley in spring and autumn because it holds an art festival during these seasons.

=== Imjingak ===
Imjingak is a park located on the banks of the Imjin River along the tracks of the former Gyeongui Train Line outside Paju. The park has many statues and monuments regarding the Korean War. There is also a restaurant, an observation deck, a pool in the shape of the Korean peninsula, and even a small amusement park.

== Specialties ==
=== Jangdan bean ===
Jangdan beans are one of Paju's famous traditional specialties. For a long time, crops have been important for Korean people's livelihood because their land and environment were suited for agriculture. Therefore, two major crops, rice and beans, have been developed over time. Jangdan bean is one of these crops that has been harvested in Paju. The name Jangdan is derived from the name of a village in Paju, which existed before the Korean War. Even though the village is now gone, people still call the bean the Jangdan bean because the former village was so well known for these beans. Today, Jangdan beans are only commonly seen in Panmunjom, which is located at the border between South Korea and North Korea.

== Education ==
The city has three polytechnic universities, including Doowon Technical University College.

=== Paju English Village ===
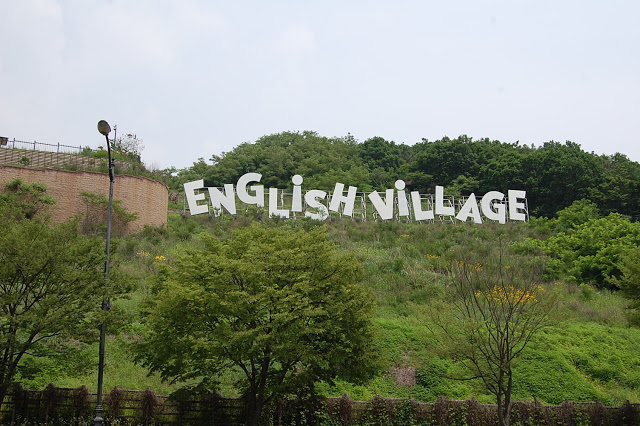

Paju English Village is a large area that was constructed to teach children English and let them experience Western culture. Hundreds of foreign teachers are employed in the village. The educational village has various curricula to provide several educational programs called "English Camp". To attend the programs, children's parents have to pay and send their children to the village for several days. The length of the program depends on the type of program. People also visit the village because of its visual and new cultural atmosphere.

== Sports ==
Paju Challengers is an independent baseball team that has been based in the city.

Paju Frontier will compete in K League 2 from 2026 season after last play in 2025 K3 League due to switch from semi-profesional to professional team.

== Administrative divisions ==
Paju is divided as follows:

- Beobwon-eup (법원읍)
- Paju-eup (파주읍)
- Munsan-eup (문산읍)
- Jori-eup (조리읍)
- Wollong-myeon (월롱면)
- Papyeong-myeon (파평면)
- Jeokseong-myeon (적성면)
- Gwangtan-myeon (광탄면)
- Tanhyeon-myeon (탄현면)
- Gunnae-myeon (군내면)
- Jangdan-myeon (장단면)
- Jinseo-myeon (진서면)
- Jindong-myeon (진동면)
- Gyoha-dong (교하동)
- Geumchon1(il)-dong (금촌1동)
  - Geumchon-dong (금촌동)
  - Adong-dong (아동동)
  - Yadong-dong (야동동)
  - Geomsan-dong (검산동)
  - Maekgeum-dong (맥금동)
- Geumchon-2(ii)-dong (금촌2동)
  - Geumchon-dong (금촌동)
  - Geumneung-dong (금능동)
- Unjeong 1(il)-dong (운정1동)
  - Gyoha-dong (교하동)
  - Dangha-dong (당하동)
  - Wadong-dong (와동동)
- Unjeong 2(i)-dong (운정2동)
  - Mokdong-dong (목동동)
- Unjeong 3(Sam)-dong (운정3동)
  - Dongpae-dong (동패동)
  - Yadang-dong (야당동)

== Military bases ==
- Camp Bonifas and Camp Liberty-Bell (home to US/ROKA Joint Security Area)
- Camp Dodge – closed
- Camp Edwards – closed
- Camp Garry Owen – closed
- Camp Giant – closed
- Camp Greaves – closed
- Camp Howze – closed
- Camp Irwin – closed
- Camp Pelham – closed
- Camp Semper Fidelis (home of 1st Provisional DMZ Police Co., 1st Marine Div. 1953–1956)
- Camp Stanton – closed
- Multi-Purpose Live Fire Complex (MLFC), also called Rodriguez Range or Rodriguez Live Fire Complex

== Military cemetery ==
The cemetery was established in 1996 to hold the remains of Korean People's Army and Chinese People's Volunteer Army soldiers killed during the Korean War. In March 2014 the Chinese remains were repatriated for reburial in Shenyang, China.

== Attractions ==
- Gloucester Valley Battle Monument ("Gloster Hill") – war memorial
- Heyri Art Valley – with 350 artists in fine arts, music, theater, photography, sculpture, crafts, and literature. It aims to promote cultural interchange, education, and exhibit and sell hand-crafted works of art.
- Jayuro Road of Freedom
- Panmunjom
- Korean Demilitarized Zone
- Paju Book City
- Tongilro Road of Unification or National Road No. 1
- Yong Ju Gol – a red-light district
- Holocaust Museum Korea – the first museum in the country dedicated to the genocide of Jews

== Notable people ==
- Sim Sang-jung, former leader of the Justice Party (South Korea), member of the National Assembly (South Korea) representing Gyeonggi Goyang A, and 2017 South Korean presidential election
- Kim Young-moo, poet and scholar
- Ahn Jung-Hwan, professional footballer and show host
- Cho Jae-jin, professional footballer
- Yoon Do-hyun, musician, lead singer of YB
- Kang Jiyoung, pop singer and actress, former member of South Korean girl group Kara
- Hwang Kwanghee, member of South Korean boy group ZE:A
- Choi Ji-woo, South Korean actress
- Danielle, member of South Korean girl group NewJeans
- Kim Eun-jung, children's writer
- Park Myung-keun, South Korean politician and four-time elected member of the National Assembly (South Korea)
- Paull Shin, American educator and politician
- Yoon Sang-hyun, actor, singer

== In popular culture ==
- It is the location of the 2009 film Paju, starring by Lee Sun-kyun and Seo Woo.
- Parts of Burning, South Korea's 2018 submission for the Academy Award for Best Foreign Language Film, are set in Paju.
- The Mnet survival show Produce 101 were filmed at the English Village.
- The Mnet survival show I-Land were filmed at the CJ E&M Contents World.
- The 2020 Mnet Asian Music Awards were filmed at the CJ E&M Contents World.

== Sister cities ==
Paju is twinned with the following places:

- Coquitlam, British Columbia, Canada
- Cuenca, Castilla–La Mancha, Spain
- Toowoomba, Queensland, Australia
- Eskişehir, Turkey
- Hadano, Kanagawa, Japan
- Jinzhou, Liaoning, China
- Mudanjiang, Heilongjiang, China
- Pasadena, California, United States
- Stellenbosch, South Africa

== See also ==
- List of cities in South Korea
