= Noga Alon =

Israeli mathematician

- נוגה אלון
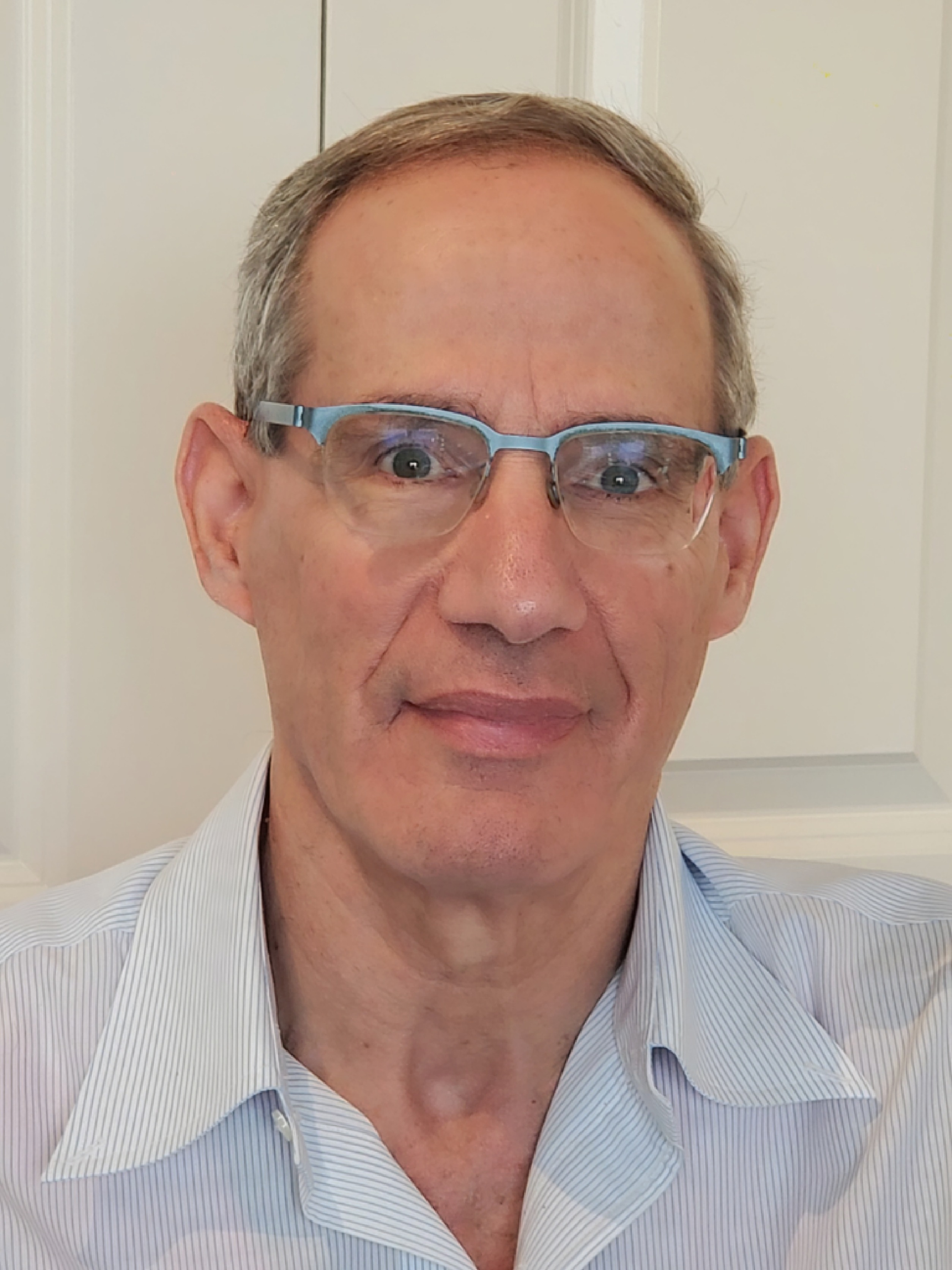
- Noga Alon
- Born: 1956 (age 69–70); Israel
- Education: Technion – Israel Institute of Technology; Tel Aviv University; Hebrew University of Jerusalem
- Known for: Combinatorial Nullstellensatz
- Awards: George Pólya Prize (2000); Gödel Prize (2005); Israel Prize in Mathematics (2008); Shaw Prize (2022); Wolf Prize in Mathematics (2024)
- Scientific career
- Fields: Mathematics; Theoretical computer science
- Workplaces: Tel Aviv University; Institute for Advanced Study; Microsoft Research, Herzeliya; Princeton University
- Thesis: Extremal Problems in Combinatorics (1983)
- Doctoral advisor: Micha Perles
- Doctoral students: Gregory Gutin; Tali Kaufman; Michael Krivelevich; Benny Sudakov; Raphael Yuster; Uri Zwick
- Website: www.math.tau.ac.il/~nogaa/

Noga M. Alon (Hebrew: נוגה אלון; born 1956) is an Israeli mathematician. He is professor emeritus at Tel Aviv University and a professor of mathematics at Princeton University noted for his contributions to combinatorics and theoretical computer science, having authored hundreds of papers.

== Education and career ==
Alon was born in 1956 in Haifa, where he graduated from the Hebrew Reali School in 1974. He graduated summa cum laude from the Technion – Israel Institute of Technology in 1979, earned a master's degree in mathematics in 1980 from Tel Aviv University, and received his Ph.D. in Mathematics at the Hebrew University of Jerusalem in 1983 with the dissertation Extremal Problems in Combinatorics supervised by Micha Perles.

After postdoctoral research at the Massachusetts Institute of Technology, Alon returned to Tel Aviv University as a senior lecturer in 1985, obtained a permanent position as an associate professor there in 1986, and was promoted to full professor in 1988. He was head of the School of Mathematical Science from 1999 to 2001, and was awarded the Florence and Ted Baumritter Combinatorics and Computer Science Chair. He retired as professor emeritus from Tel Aviv and became a professor at Princeton University in 2018.

He was editor-in-chief of the journal Random Structures and Algorithms from 2008 through 2023.

== Research ==
Alon's research is focused on combinatorics, theoretical computer science, and probabilistic method, sometimes under the pseudonym "A. Nilli", based on the name of his daughter.

== Selected works ==
=== Book ===
- The Probabilistic Method, with Joel Spencer, Wiley, 1992. 2nd ed., 2000; 3rd ed., 2008; 4th ed., 2016.

=== Research articles ===
- Alon, N. (1986). "Eigenvalues and expanders". Combinatorica. 6 (2): 83–96. doi:10.1007/BF02579166. MR 0875835. S2CID 41083612.
- Alon, N.; Boppana, R. B. (1987). "The monotone circuit complexity of Boolean functions". Combinatorica. 7 (1): 1–22. doi:10.1007/BF02579196. MR 0905147. S2CID 17397273.
- Alon, Noga (1987). "Splitting necklaces". Advances in Mathematics. 63 (3): 247–253. doi:10.1016/0001-8708(87)90055-7. MR 0877785.
- Alon, Noga; Kleitman, Daniel J (1992). "Piercing convex sets and the Hadwiger–Debrunner (p, q)-problem". Advances in Mathematics. 96 (1): 103–112. doi:10.1016/0001-8708(92)90052-M. MR 1185788.
- Alon, Noga; Yuster, Raphael; Zwick, Uri (1995). "Color-coding". Journal of the ACM. 42 (4): 844–856. doi:10.1145/210332.210337. MR 1411787. S2CID 208936467.
- Alon, Noga; Matias, Yossi; Szegedy, Mario (1999). "The space complexity of approximating the frequency moments". Journal of Computer and System Sciences. 58 (1, part 2): 137–147. doi:10.1006/jcss.1997.1545. MR 1688610. Previously in the ACM Symposium on Theory of Computing (STOC), 1996.
- Alon, Noga (1999). "Combinatorial Nullstellensatz". Combinatorics, Probability and Computing. 8 (1–2): 7–29. doi:10.1017/S0963548398003411. MR 1684621. S2CID 209877602.

== Awards ==
Alon has received a number of awards, including the following:

- 1989 – Erdős Prize;
- 2000 – George Pólya Prize in Applied Combinatorics of the Society for Industrial and Applied Mathematics
- 2001 – Michael Bruno Memorial Award of the Israel Institute for Advanced Studies;
- 2005 – Gödel Prize, with Yossi Matias and Mario Szegedy, for their paper "The space complexity of approximating the frequency moments" on streaming algorithms
- 2008 – Israel Prize, for mathematics.
- 2011 – EMET Prize, with Saharon Shelah, for mathematics.
- 2019 – Paris Kanellakis Award, with Phillip Gibbons, Yossi Matias and Mario Szegedy, "for foundational work on streaming algorithms and their application to large scale data analytics"
- 2021 – Leroy P. Steele Prize for Mathematical Exposition, with Joel Spencer, for The Probabilistic Method
- 2022 – Shaw Prize in Mathematical Sciences, with Ehud Hrushovski, "for their remarkable contributions to discrete mathematics and model theory with interaction notably with algebraic geometry, topology and computer sciences"
- 2022 – Knuth Prize, "for foundational contributions in combinatorics and graph theory and applications to fundamental topics in computer science"
- 2024 – Wolf Prize in Mathematics "for his fundamental contributions to Combinatorics and Theoretical Computer Science”.

Alon gave plenary addresses at the 1996 European Congress of Mathematics, at the 2002 International Congress of Mathematicians, at the 2009 Turán Memorial Lectures, and a lecture in the 1990 International Congress of Mathematicians. In 2015 he gave the Łojasiewicz Lecture (on the "Signrank and its applications in combinatorics and complexity") at the Jagiellonian University in Kraków. He was given an honorary doctorate by ETH Zurich in 2013 and by the University of Waterloo in 2015.

In addition, Alon has been a member of the Israel Academy of Sciences and Humanities since 1997. He was elected to the Academia Europaea in 2008. In 2015 he was elected as a fellow of the American Mathematical Society. In 2017 he became a Fellow of the Association for Computing Machinery. In 2019 he was named an honorary member of the Hungarian Academy of Sciences.

In 2024, Alon gave the opening plenary talk on "Distance problems for typical norms" at the 33rd Cumberland Conference on Combinatorics, Graph Theory, and Computing at Mississippi State University.

== See also ==
- Necklace splitting problem
- List of Israel Prize recipients
