= Forbidden subgraph =

Forbidden subgraph may refer to:

- Forbidden subgraph characterization, in graph theory, a characterization of a family of graphs by exclusion of graphs containing certain "forbidden" subgraphs
- Forbidden subgraph problem, in extremal graph theory
