= Biclique-free graph =

Property in graph theory

The graph K_{3,3}, a graph that is not 3-biclique-free, and a graph that is 3-biclique-free, respectively.

In graph theory, a branch of mathematics, a t-biclique-free graph is a graph that has no K_{t,t} (complete bipartite graph with 2t vertices) as a subgraph. A family of graphs is biclique-free if there exists a number t such that the graphs in the family are all t-biclique-free. The biclique-free graph families form one of the most general types of sparse graph family. They arise in incidence problems in discrete geometry, and have also been used in parameterized complexity.

== Properties ==
=== Sparsity ===
According to the Kővári–Sós–Turán theorem, every n-vertex t-biclique-free graph has O(n^{2 − 1/t}) edges, significantly fewer than a dense graph would have. Conversely, if a graph family is defined by forbidden subgraphs or closed under the operation of taking subgraphs, and does not include dense graphs of arbitrarily large size, it must be t-biclique-free for some t, for otherwise it would include large dense complete bipartite graphs.

As a lower bound, Erdős, Hajnal & Moon (1964) conjectured that every maximal t-biclique-free bipartite graph (one to which no more edges can be added without creating a t-biclique) has at least (t − 1)(n + m − t + 1) edges, where n and m are the numbers of vertices on each side of its bipartition.

=== Relation to other types of sparse graph family ===
A graph with degeneracy d is necessarily (d + 1)-biclique-free. Additionally, any nowhere dense family of graphs is biclique-free. More generally, if there exists an n-vertex graph that is not a 1-shallow minor of any graph in the family, then the family must be n-biclique-free, because all n-vertex graphs are 1-shallow minors of K_{n,n}. In this way, the biclique-free graph families unify two of the most general classes of sparse graphs.

== Applications ==
=== Discrete geometry ===
In discrete geometry, many types of incidence graph are necessarily biclique-free. As a simple example, the graph of incidences between a finite set of points and lines in the Euclidean plane necessarily has no K_{2,2} subgraph.

=== Parameterized complexity ===
Biclique-free graphs have been used in parameterized complexity to develop algorithms that are efficient for sparse graphs with suitably small input parameter values. In particular, finding a dominating set of size k, on t-biclique-free graphs, is fixed-parameter tractable when parameterized by k + t, even though there is strong evidence that this is not possible using k alone as a parameter. Similar results are true for many variations of the dominating set problem. It is also possible to test whether one dominating set of size at most k can be converted to another one by a chain of vertex insertions and deletions, preserving the dominating property, with the same parameterization.
