= Turán graph =

Balanced complete multipartite graph

- The Turán graph T(13,4)
- Named after: Pál Turán
- Vertices: $n$
- Edges: ~$\left(1- \frac{1}{r}\right)\frac{n^2}{2}$
- Radius: $\left\{\begin{array}{ll}\infty & r = 1\\ 2 & r \le n/2\\ 1 & \text{otherwise}\end{array}\right.$
- Diameter: $\left\{\begin{array}{ll}\infty & r = 1\\ 1 & r = n\\ 2 & \text{otherwise}\end{array}\right.$
- Girth: $\left\{\begin{array}{ll}\infty & r = 1 \vee (n \le 3 \wedge r \le 2)\\ 4 & r = 2\\ 3 & \text{otherwise}\end{array}\right.$
- Chromatic number: $r$
- Notation: $T(n,r)$

The Turán graph, denoted by $T(n,r)$, is a complete multipartite graph; it is formed by partitioning a set of $n$ vertices into $r$ subsets, with sizes as equal as possible, and then connecting two vertices by an edge if and only if they belong to different subsets. Where $q$ and $s$ are the quotient and remainder of dividing $n$ by $r$ (so $n = qr + s$), the graph is of the form $K_{q+1, q+1, \ldots, q, q}$, and the number of edges is

$$\left(1 - \frac{1}{r}\right)\frac{n^2 - s^2}{2} + {s \choose 2}$$.

The edge count can be more succinctly stated as $\left\lfloor\left(1-\frac1r\right)\frac{n^2}2\right\rfloor$. The graph has $s$ subsets of size $q+ 1$, and $r - s$ subsets of size $q$; each vertex has degree $n-q-1$ or $n-q$. It is a regular graph if $n$ is divisible by $r$ (i.e. when $s=0$).

== Turán's theorem ==
Turán graphs are named after Pál Turán, who used them to prove Turán's theorem, an important result in extremal graph theory.

By the pigeonhole principle, every set of r + 1 vertices in the Turán graph includes two vertices in the same partition subset; therefore, the Turán graph does not contain a clique of size r + 1. According to Turán's theorem, the Turán graph has the maximum possible number of edges among all (r + 1)-clique-free graphs with n vertices. Keevash & Sudakov (2003) show that the Turán graph is also the only (r + 1)-clique-free graph of order n in which every subset of αn vertices spans at least $\frac{r\,{-}\,1}{3r}(2\alpha -1)n^2$ edges, if α is sufficiently close to 1. The Erdős–Stone theorem extends Turán's theorem by bounding the number of edges in a graph that does not have a fixed Turán graph as a subgraph. Via this theorem, similar bounds in extremal graph theory can be proven for any excluded subgraph, depending on the chromatic number of the subgraph.

== Special cases ==
The octahedron, a 3-cross polytope whose edges and vertices form K_{2,2,2}, a Turán graph T(6,3). Unconnected vertices are given the same color in this face-centered projection.

Several choices of the parameter r in a Turán graph lead to notable graphs that have been independently studied.

The Turán graph T(2n,n) can be formed by removing a perfect matching from a complete graph K_{2n}. As Roberts (1969) showed, this graph has boxicity exactly n; it is sometimes known as the Roberts graph. This graph is also the 1-skeleton of an n-dimensional cross-polytope; for instance, the graph T(6,3) = K_{2,2,2} is the octahedral graph, the graph of the regular octahedron. If n couples go to a party, and each person shakes hands with every person except his or her partner, then this graph describes the set of handshakes that take place; for this reason, it is also called the cocktail party graph.

The Turán graph T(n,2) is a complete bipartite graph and, when n is even, a Moore graph. When r is a divisor of n, the Turán graph is symmetric and strongly regular, although some authors consider Turán graphs to be a trivial case of strong regularity and therefore exclude them from the definition of a strongly regular graph.

The class of Turán graphs can have exponentially many maximal cliques, meaning this class does not have few cliques. For example, the Turán graph $T(n,\lceil n/3\rceil)$ has 3^{a}2^{b} maximal cliques, where 3a + 2b = n and b ≤ 2; each maximal clique is formed by choosing one vertex from each partition subset. This is the largest number of maximal cliques possible among all n-vertex graphs regardless of the number of edges in the graph; these graphs are sometimes called Moon–Moser graphs.

== Other properties ==
Every Turán graph is a cograph; that is, it can be formed from individual vertices by a sequence of disjoint union and complement operations. Specifically, such a sequence can begin by forming each of the independent sets of the Turán graph as a disjoint union of isolated vertices. Then, the overall graph is the complement of the disjoint union of the complements of these independent sets.

Chao & Novacky (1982) show that the Turán graphs are chromatically unique: no other graphs have the same chromatic polynomials. Nikiforov (2005) uses Turán graphs to supply a lower bound for the sum of the kth eigenvalues of a graph and its complement.

Falls, Powell & Snoeyink (2003) develop an efficient algorithm for finding clusters of orthologous groups of genes in genome data, by representing the data as a graph and searching for large Turán subgraphs.

Turán graphs also have some interesting properties related to geometric graph theory. Pór & Wood (2005) give a lower bound of Ω((rn)^{3/4}) on the volume of any three-dimensional grid embedding of the Turán graph. Witsenhausen (1974) conjectures that the maximum sum of squared distances, among n points with unit diameter in R^{d}, is attained for a configuration formed by embedding a Turán graph onto the vertices of a regular simplex.

An n-vertex graph G is a subgraph of a Turán graph T(n,r) if and only if G admits an equitable coloring with r colors. The partition of the Turán graph into independent sets corresponds to the partition of G into color classes. In particular, the Turán graph is the unique maximal n-vertex graph with an r-color equitable coloring.
