= Graph morphism =

Graph morphism may refer to:

- Graph homomorphism, in graph theory, a homomorphism between graphs
- Graph morphism, in algebraic geometry, a type of morphism of schemes
