= Hedetniemi's conjecture =

Conjecture in graph theory

Example of Hedetniemi's conjecture: the tensor product of C5 and C3 (on the left) produces a graph that contains a cycle with length 15 (on the right) so: the resulting graph requires 3 colors.

In graph theory, Hedetniemi's conjecture, formulated by Stephen T. Hedetniemi in 1966, concerns the connection between graph coloring and the tensor product of graphs. This conjecture states that

$$\chi (G \times H ) = \min\{\chi (G) , \chi (H)\}.$$

Here $\chi(G)$ denotes the chromatic number of an undirected finite graph $G$.

The inequality χ(G × H) ≤ min {χ(G), χ(H)} is easy: if G is k-colored, one can k-color G × H by using the same coloring for each copy of G in the product; symmetrically if H is k-colored. Thus, Hedetniemi's conjecture amounts to the assertion that tensor products cannot be colored with an unexpectedly small number of colors.

A counterexample to the conjecture was discovered by Yaroslav Shitov (2019) (see Kalai 2019), thus disproving the conjecture in general.

== Known cases ==
Any graph with a nonempty set of edges requires at least two colors; if G and H are not 1-colorable, that is, they both contain an edge, then their product also contains an edge, and is hence not 1-colorable either. In particular, the conjecture is true when G or H is a bipartite graph, since then its chromatic number is either 1 or 2.

Similarly, if two graphs G and H are not 2-colorable, that is, not bipartite, then both contain a cycle of odd length. Since the product of two odd cycle graphs contains an odd cycle, the product G × H is not 2-colorable either. In other words, if G × H is 2-colorable, then at least one of G and H must be 2-colorable as well.

The next case was proved long after the conjecture's statement, by El-Zahar & Sauer (1985): if the product G × H is 3-colorable, then one of G or H must also be 3-colorable. In particular, the conjecture is true whenever G or H is 4-colorable (since then the inequality χ(G × H) ≤ min {χ(G), χ(H)} can only be strict when G × H is 3-colorable). In the remaining cases, both graphs in the tensor product are at least 5-chromatic and progress has only been made for very restricted situations.

== Weak Hedetniemi Conjecture ==
The following function (known as the Poljak-Rödl function) measures how low the chromatic number of products of n-chromatic graphs can be.

$$f(n) = \min\{ \chi (G \times H) \colon \chi (G) = \chi (H) = n \}$$

Hedetniemi's conjecture is then equivalent to saying that f(n) = n. The Weak Hedetniemi Conjecture instead states merely that the function f(n) is unbounded. In other words, if the tensor product of two graphs can be colored with few colors, this should imply some bound on the chromatic number of one of the factors.

The main result of (Poljak & Rödl 1981), independently improved by Poljak, James H. Schmerl, and Zhu, states that if the function f(n) is bounded, then it is bounded by at most 9. Thus a proof of Hedetniemi's conjecture for 10-chromatic graphs would already imply the Weak Hedetniemi Conjecture for all graphs.

== Multiplicative graphs ==
The conjecture is studied in the more general context of graph homomorphisms, especially because of interesting relations to the category of graphs (with graphs as objects and homomorphisms as arrows). For any fixed graph K, one considers graphs G that admit a homomorphism to K, written G → K. These are also called K-colorable graphs. This generalizes the usual notion of graph coloring, since it follows from definitions that a k-coloring is the same as a K_{k}-coloring (a homomorphism into the complete graph on k vertices).

A graph K is called multiplicative if for any graphs G, H, the fact that G × H → K holds implies that G → K or H → K holds. As with classical colorings, the reverse implication always holds: if G (or H, symmetrically) is K-colorable, then G × H is easily K-colored by using the same values independently of H. Hedetniemi's conjecture is then equivalent to the statement that each complete graph is multiplicative.

The above known cases are equivalent to saying that K_{1}, K_{2}, and K_{3} are multiplicative. The case of K_{4} is widely open. On the other hand, the proof of El-Zahar & Sauer (1985) has been generalized by Häggkvist et al. (1988) to show that all cycle graphs are multiplicative. Later, Tardif (2005) proved more generally that all circular cliques K_{n/k} with n/k < 4 are multiplicative. In terms of the circular chromatic number χ_{c}, this means that if χ_{c}(G×H) < 4, then χ_{c}(G×H) = min { χ_{c}(G), χ_{c}(H)} . Wrochna (2017) has shown that square-free graphs are multiplicative.

Examples of non-multiplicative graphs can be constructed from two graphs G and H that are not comparable in the homomorphism order (that is, neither G→H nor H→G holds). In this case, letting K=G×H, we trivially have G×H→K, but neither G nor H can admit a homomorphism into K, since composed with the projection K→H or K→G it would give a contradiction.

== Exponential graph ==
Since the tensor product of graphs is the category-theoretic product in the category of graphs (with graphs as objects and homomorphisms as arrows), the conjecture can be rephrased in terms of the following construction on graphs K and G. The exponential graph K^{G} is the graph with all functions V(G) → V(K) as vertices (not only homomorphisms) and two functions f,g adjacent when

f(v) is adjacent to g(v') in K, for all adjacent vertices v,v ' of G.

In Particular, there is a loop at a function f (it is adjacent to itself) if and only if the function gives a homomorphism from G to K. Seen differently, there is an edge between f and g whenever the two functions define a homomorphism from G × K_{2} (the bipartite double cover of G) to K.

The exponential graph is the exponential object in the category of graphs. This means homomorphisms from G × H to a graph K correspond to homomorphisms from H to K^{G}. Moreover, there is a homomorphism eval : G × K^{G} → K given by eval(v,f) = f(v). These properties allow to conclude that the multiplicativity of K is equivalent (El-Zahar & Sauer 1985) to the statement:

either G or K^{G} is K-colorable, for every graph G.

In other words, Hedetniemi's conjecture can be seen as a statement on exponential graphs: for every integer k, the graph K_{k}^{G} is either k-colorable, or it contains a loop (meaning G is k-colorable). One can also see the homomorphisms eval : G × K_{k}^{G} → K_{k} as the hardest instances of Hedetniemi's conjecture: if the product G × H was a counterexample, then G × K_{k}^{G} would also be a counterexample.

== Generalizations ==
Generalized to directed graphs, the conjecture has simple counterexamples, as observed by Poljak & Rödl (1981). Here, the chromatic number of a directed graph is just the chromatic number of the underlying graph, but the tensor product has exactly half the number of edges (for directed edges g→g' in G and h→h' in H, the tensor product G × H has only one edge, from (g,h) to (g',h'), while the product of the underlying undirected graphs would have an edge between (g,h') and (g',h) as well). However, the Weak Hedetniemi Conjecture turns out to be equivalent in the directed and undirected settings (Tardif & Wehlau 2006).

The problem cannot be generalized to infinite graphs: Hajnal (1985) gave an example of two infinite graphs, each requiring an uncountable number of colors, such that their product can be colored with only countably many colors. Rinot (2013) proved that in the constructible universe, for every infinite cardinal $\kappa$, there exist a pair of graphs of chromatic number greater than $\kappa$, such that their product can still be colored with only countably many colors.

== Related problems ==
A similar equality for the cartesian product of graphs was proven by Sabidussi (1957) and rediscovered several times afterwards. An exact formula is also known for the lexicographic product of graphs. Duffus, Sands & Woodrow (1985) introduced two stronger conjectures involving unique colorability.
