= Core (graph theory) =

The core $C$ (in red) of the truncated tetrahedron graph $G$.

In the mathematical field of graph theory, a core is a notion that describes behavior of a graph with respect to graph homomorphisms.

== Definition ==
Graph $C$ is a core if every homomorphism $f:C \to C$ is an isomorphism, that is it is a bijection of vertices of $C$.

A core of a graph $G$ is a graph $C$ such that

1. There exists a homomorphism from $G$ to $C$,
2. there exists a homomorphism from $C$ to $G$, and
3. $C$ is minimal with this property.

Two graphs are homomorphically equivalent if and only if they have isomorphic cores.

== Examples ==
- Any complete graph is a core.
- A cycle of odd length is a core.
- A graph $G$ is a core if and only if the core of $G$ is equal to $G$.
- Every two cycles of even length, and more generally every two bipartite graphs are hom-equivalent. The core of each of these graphs is the two-vertex complete graph K_{2}.
- By the Beckman–Quarles theorem, the infinite unit distance graph on all points of the Euclidean plane or of any higher-dimensional Euclidean space is a core.

== Properties ==
Every finite graph has a core, which is determined uniquely, up to isomorphism. The core of a graph G is always an induced subgraph of G. If $G \to H$ and $H \to G$ then the graphs $G$ and $H$ are necessarily homomorphically equivalent.

== Computational complexity ==
It is NP-complete to test whether a graph has a homomorphism to a proper subgraph, and co-NP-complete to test whether a graph is its own core (i.e. whether no such homomorphism exists) (Hell & Nešetřil 1992).
