= Homomorphism density =

Fraction of graph maps that are homomorphisms

In the mathematical field of extremal graph theory, homomorphism density with respect to a graph $H$ is a parameter $t(H,-)$ that is associated to each graph $G$ in the following manner:

$$t(H,G):=\frac{\left|\operatorname{hom}(H,G)\right|}{|V(G)|^{|V(H)|}}$$.

Above, $\operatorname{hom}(H,G)$ is the set of graph homomorphisms, or adjacency preserving maps, from $H$ to $G$. Density can also be interpreted as the probability that a map from the vertices of $H$ to the vertices of $G$ chosen uniformly at random is a graph homomorphism. There is a connection between homomorphism densities and subgraph densities, which is elaborated on below.

== Examples ==
- The edge density of a graph $G$ is given by $t(K_{2},G)$.
- The number of walks with $k-1$ steps is given by $\operatorname{hom}(P_k, G)$.
- $\operatorname{hom}(C_k, G) = \operatorname{Tr}(A^k)$ where $A$ is the adjacency matrix of $G$.
- The proportion of colorings using $k$ colors that are proper is given by $t(G, K_k)$.

Other important properties such as the number of stable sets or the maximum cut can be expressed or estimated in terms of homomorphism numbers or densities.

== Subgraph densities ==
We define the (labeled) subgraph density of $H$ in $G$ to be

$$d(H,G):=\frac{\# \text{ labeled copies of } H \text{ in } G}{|V(G)|^{|V(H)|}}$$.

Note that it might be slightly dubious to call this a density, as we are not quite dividing through by the total number of labeled subgraphs on $|V(H)|$ vertices of $G$, but our definition is asymptotically equivalent and simpler to analyze for our purposes. Observe that any labeled copy of $H$ in $G$ corresponds to a homomorphism of $H$ into $G$. However, not every homomorphism corresponds to a labeled copy − there are some degenerate cases, in which multiple vertices of $H$ are sent to the same vertex of $G$. That said, the number of such degenerate homomorphisms is only $O(n^{|V(H)|-1})$, so we have $t(H,G)=d(H,G)+O(1/n)$. For instance, we see that for graphs with constant homomorphism density, the labeled subgraph density and homomorphism density are asymptotically equivalent. For $H$ being a complete graph $K_m$, the homomorphism density and subgraph density are in fact equal (for $G$ without self-loops), as the edges of $K_m$ force all images under a graph homomorphism to be distinct.

== Generalization to graphons ==
The notion of homomorphism density can be generalized to the case where instead of a graph $G$, we have a graphon $W$,

$$t(H,W)=\int_{[0,1]^{|V(H)|}}\prod_{ij\in E(H)}W(x_{i},x_{j})\prod_{i\in V(H)}dx_{i}$$

Note that the integrand is a product that runs over the edges in the subgraph $H$, whereas the differential is a product running over the vertices in $H$. Intuitively, each vertex $i$ in $H$ is represented by the variable $x_{i}.$ For example, the triangle density in a graphon is given by

$$t(K_3, W) = \int\limits_{[0,1]^3} W(x,y)W(y,z)W(z,x) dx dy dz$$.

This definition of homomorphism density is indeed a generalization, because for every graph $G$ and its associated step graphon $W_{G}$, $t(H,G)=t(H,W_{G})$.

The definition can be further extended to all symmetric, measurable functions $W$. The following example demonstrates the benefit of this further generalization. Relative to the function $W(x,y) = 2\cos(2\pi(x-y))$, the density of $H$ in $W$ is the number of Eulerian cycles in $H$.

This notion is helpful in understanding asymptotic behavior of homomorphism densities of graphs which satisfy certain property, since a graphon is a limit of a sequence of graphs.

== Inequalities ==
Many results in extremal graph theory can be described by inequalities involving homomorphism densities associated to a graph. The following are a sequence of examples relating the density of triangles to the density of edges.

=== Turán's Theorem ===
A classic example is Turán's Theorem, which states that if $t(K_{r},W)=0$, then $t(K_{2},W) \leq \left(1-\frac{1}{r-1}\right)$. A special case of this is Mantel's Theorem, which states that if $t(K_{3},W)=0$, then $t(K_{2},W)\leq 1/2$.

=== Goodman's Theorem ===
An extension of Mantel's Theorem provides an explicit lower bound on triangle densities in terms of edge densities.

Theorem (Goodman). $t(K_3, G) \geq t(K_2, G)(2t(K_2, G) - 1).$

=== Kruskal-Katona Theorem ===
A converse inequality to Goodman's Theorem is a special case of Kruskal–Katona theorem, which states that $t(K_3, G) \leq t(K_2, G)^{3/2}$. It turns out that both of these inequalities are tight for specific edge densities.

Proof. It is sufficient to prove this inequality for any graph $G$. Say $G$ is a graph on $n$ vertices, and $\{\lambda_{i}\}_{i=1}^{n}$ are the eigenvalues of its adjacency matrix $A_{G}$. By spectral graph theory, we know

$\operatorname{hom}(K_{2},G)=t(K_{2},G)|V(G)|^{2}=\sum_{i=1}^{n}\lambda_{i}^{2}$, and $\operatorname{hom}(K_{3},G)=t(K_{3},G)|V(G)|^{3}=\sum_{i=1}^{n}\lambda_{i}^{3}$.

The conclusion then comes from the following inequality:

$$\operatorname{hom}(K_{3},G)=\sum_{i=1}^{n}\lambda_{i}^{3}\leq\left(\sum_{i=1}^{n}\lambda_{i}^{2}\right)^{3/2}=\operatorname{hom}(K_{2},G)^{3/2}$$.

=== Description of triangle vs edge density ===
A more complete description of the relationship between $t(K_3, G)$ and $t(K_2, G)$ was proven by Razborov. His work from 2008 completes the understanding of a homomorphism inequality problem, the description of $D_{2,3}$, which is the region of feasible edge density, triangle density pairs in a graphon.

$D_{2,3}=\{(t(K_{2},W),t(K_{3},W))\;:\;W\text{ is a graphon}\}\subseteq [0,1]^{2}$.

The upper boundary of the region is tight and given by the Kruskal-Katona Theorem. The lower boundary is main result of work by Razborov in providing a complete description.

== Useful tools ==
=== Cauchy-Schwarz ===
One particularly useful inequality to analyze homomorphism densities is the Cauchy–Schwarz inequality. The effect of applying the Cauchy-Schwarz inequality is "folding" the graph over a line of symmetry to relate it to a smaller graph. This allows for the reduction of densities of large but symmetric graphs to that of smaller graphs. As an example, we prove that the cycle of length 4 is Sidorenko. If the vertices are labelled 1,2,3,4 in that order, the diagonal through vertices 1 and 3 is a line of symmetry. Folding over this line relates $C_4$ to the complete bipartite graph $K_{1,2}$. Mathematically, this is formalized as

$$\begin{align}
t(C_4, G) &= \int_{1,2,3,4} W(1,2)W(2,3)W(3,4)W(1,4) = \int_{1,3}\left(\int_2 W(1,2)W(2,3)\right)\left(\int_4 W(1,4)W(4,3)\right) = \int_{1,3}\left(\int_2 W(1,2)W(2,3)\right)^2 \\
&\geq \left(\int_{1,2,3} W(1,2)W(2,3)\right)^2 = t(K_{1,2}, G)^2
\end{align}$$

where we applied Cauchy-Schwarz to "fold" vertex 2 onto vertex 4. The same technique can be used to show $t(K_{1,2}, G) \geq t(K_2, G)^2$, which combined with the above verifies that $C_4$ is a Sidorenko graph.

The generalization Hölder's inequality can also be used in a similar manner to fold graphs multiple times with a single step. It is also possible to apply the more general form of Cauchy-Schwarz to fold graphs in the case that certain edges lie on the line of symmetry.

=== Lagrangian ===
The Lagrangian can be useful in analyzing extremal problems. The quantity is defined to be

$$L(H) = \max_{\begin{matrix}x_1, \ldots, x_n \geq 0 \\ x_1 + \cdots x_n = 1 \end{matrix} } \sum_{e \in E(H)} \prod_{v \in e} x_v$$.

One useful fact is that a maximizing vector $x$ is equally supported on the vertices of a clique in $H$. The following is an application of analyzing this quantity.

According to Hamed Hatami and Sergei Norine, one can convert any algebraic inequality between homomorphism densities to a linear inequality. In some situations, deciding whether such an inequality is true or not can be simplified, such as it is the case in the following theorem.

Theorem (Bollobás). Let $a_{1},\cdots,a_{n}$ be real constants. Then, the inequality

$$\sum_{i=1}^{n}a_{i}t(K_{i},G)\geq 0$$

holds for every graph $G$ if and only if it holds for every complete graph $K_{m}$.

However, we get a much harder problem, in fact an undecidable one, when we have a homomorphism inequalities on a more general set of graphs $H_{i}$:

Theorem (Hatami, Norine). Let $a_{1},\cdots,a_{n}$ be real constants, and $\{H_{i}\}_{i=1}^{n}$ graphs. Then, it is an undecidable problem to determine whether the homomorphism density inequality

$$\sum_{i=1}^{n}a_{r}t(H_{i},G)\geq 0$$

holds for every graph $G$.

A recent observation proves that any linear homomorphism density inequality is a consequence of the positive semi-definiteness of a certain infinite matrix, or to the positivity of a quantum graph; in other words, any such inequality would follow from applications of the Cauchy-Schwarz Inequality.

== See also ==
- Common graph
- Sidorenko's conjecture
