= Tensor product of graphs =

Operation in graph theory

The tensor product of graphs.

In graph theory, the tensor product G × H of graphs G and H is a graph such that

- the vertex set of G × H is the Cartesian product V(G) × V(H); and
- vertices (g,h) and (g',h' ) are adjacent in G × H if and only if
  - g is adjacent to g' in G, and
  - h is adjacent to h' in H.

The tensor product is also called the direct product, Kronecker product, categorical product, cardinal product, relational product, weak direct product, or conjunction. As an operation on binary relations, the tensor product was introduced by Alfred North Whitehead and Bertrand Russell in their Principia Mathematica (1912). It is also equivalent to the Kronecker product of the adjacency matrices of the graphs.

The notation G × H was formerly (and occasionally still is) used to represent the Cartesian product of graphs, which nowadays is usually written G □ H. The cross symbol in G × H depicts the two edges resulting from the tensor product of two edges, whereas G □ H has four resulting edges. This product should not be confused with the strong product of graphs.

== Examples ==
- The tensor product G × K_{2} is a bipartite graph, called the bipartite double cover of G. The bipartite double cover of the Petersen graph is the Desargues graph: K_{2} × G(5,2) = G(10,3). The bipartite double cover of a complete graph K_{n} is a crown graph (a complete bipartite graph K_{n,n} minus a perfect matching).
- The tensor product of a complete graph with itself is the complement of a Rook's graph. Its vertices can be placed in an n-by-n grid, so that each vertex is adjacent to the vertices that are not in the same row or column of the grid.

== Properties ==
The tensor product is the category-theoretic product in the category of graphs and graph homomorphisms. That is, a homomorphism to G × H corresponds to a pair of homomorphisms to G and to H. In particular, a graph I admits a homomorphism into G × H if and only if it admits a homomorphism into G and into H.

To see that, in one direction, observe that a pair of homomorphisms f_{G} : I → G and f_{H} : I → H yields a homomorphism

$$\begin{cases} f : I \to G \times H \\ f(v) = \left (f_G(v), f_H(v) \right ) \end{cases}$$

In the other direction, a homomorphism f : I → G × H can be composed with the projections homomorphisms

$$\begin{cases} \pi_G : G \times H \to G \\ \pi_G((u,u')) = u \end{cases} \qquad  \qquad \begin{cases} \pi_H : G \times H \to H \\ \pi_H((u,u')) = u' \end{cases}$$

to yield homomorphisms to G and to H.

The adjacency matrix of G × H is the Kronecker (tensor) product of the adjacency matrices of G and H.

If a graph can be represented as a tensor product, then there may be multiple different representations (tensor products do not satisfy unique factorization) but each representation has the same number of irreducible factors. Imrich (1998) gives a polynomial time algorithm for recognizing tensor product graphs and finding a factorization of any such graph.

If either G or H is bipartite, then so is their tensor product. G × H is connected if and only if both factors are connected and at least one factor is nonbipartite. In particular the bipartite double cover of G is connected if and only if G is connected and nonbipartite.

The Hedetniemi conjecture, which gave a formula for the chromatic number of a tensor product, was disproved by Yaroslav Shitov (2019).

The tensor product of graphs equips the category of graphs and graph homomorphisms with the structure of a symmetric closed monoidal category. Let G_{0} denote the underlying set of vertices of the graph G. The internal hom [G, H] has functions f : G_{0} → H_{0} as vertices and an edge from f : G_{0} → H_{0} to f' : G_{0} → H_{0} whenever an edge {x, y} in G implies {f (x), f ' (y)} in H.

== See also ==
- Graph product
- Strong product of graphs
