= Oriented coloring =

Special type of graph coloring

An oriented coloring of a graph $G$. Although all bipartite graphs can be 2-colored, this oriented bipartite graph requires at least 3 colors, meaning its oriented chromatic number $\chi_o(G) = 3$.

In graph theory, oriented graph coloring is a special type of graph coloring. Namely, it is an assignment of colors to vertices of an oriented graph that

- is proper: no two adjacent vertices get the same color, and
- is consistently oriented: for each two edges connecting vertices of the same two colors, both edges have the same color at their start and the same color at their destination.

Here, an oriented graph is a special kind of directed graph, with at most one directed edge between each pair of vertices. An oriented graph coloring of a graph $G$ can be described equivalently as another oriented graph $H$ whose vertices represent colors, together with a homomorphism from $G$ to $H$. The homomorphism maps each vertex in $G$ to its color in $H$.

The oriented chromatic number of an oriented graph $G$ is the fewest colors needed in an oriented coloring; it is usually denoted by $\chi_o(G)$. The same definition can be extended to undirected graphs as well by defining the oriented chromatic number of an undirected graph to be the largest oriented chromatic number of any of its orientations.

== Examples ==
The oriented chromatic number of a directed 5-cycle is five. If the cycle is colored by four or fewer colors, then either two adjacent vertices have the same color, or two vertices two steps apart have the same color. In the latter case, the edges connecting these two vertices to the vertex between them are inconsistently oriented: both have the same pair of colors but with opposite orientations. Thus, no coloring with four or fewer colors is possible. However, giving each vertex its own unique color leads to a valid oriented coloring.

== Properties ==
An oriented coloring can exist only for a directed graph with no loops or directed 2-cycles. For, a loop cannot have different colors at its endpoints, and a 2-cycle cannot have both of its edges consistently oriented between the same two colors. If these conditions are satisfied, then there always exists an oriented coloring, for instance the coloring that assigns a different color to each vertex.

If an oriented coloring is complete, in the sense that no two colors can be merged to produce a coloring with fewer colors, then it corresponds uniquely to a graph homomorphism into a tournament. The tournament has one vertex for each color in the coloring. For each pair of colors, there is an edge in the colored graph with those two colors at its endpoints, which lends its orientation to the edge in the tournament between the vertices corresponding to the two colors. Incomplete colorings may also be represented by homomorphisms into tournaments but in this case the correspondence between colorings and homomorphisms is not one-to-one.

Undirected graphs of bounded genus, bounded degree, or bounded acyclic chromatic number also have bounded oriented chromatic number.

== See also ==
- Sopena wrote a survey paper about oriented graph coloring.
- The Oriented Coloring page (maintained by Sopena)
