= R. Malhotra =

R. Malhotra may refer to:

- Rajiv Malhotra (born 1950), Indian-American entrepreneur and Hindu nationalist writer
- Renu Malhotra (born 1961), Indian-American planetary scientist
