= Dermott's law =

Formula to determine satellite orbital period

Dermott's law is an empirical formula for the orbital period of major satellites orbiting planets in the Solar System. It was identified by the celestial mechanics researcher Stanley Dermott in the 1960s and takes the form:

$T(n) = T(0) \cdot C$ $^{n}$

for $n = 1, 2, 3, 4 \ldots$

Where T(n) is the orbital period of the n^{th} satellite, T(0) is of the order of days and C is a constant of the satellite system in question. Specific values are:

- Jovian system: T(0) = 0.444 d, C = 2.03
- Saturnian system: T(0)=0.462 d, C = 1.59
- Uranian system: T(0) = 0.760 d, C = 1.80

Such power-laws may be a consequence of collapsing-cloud models of planetary and satellite systems possessing various symmetries; see Titius-Bode law. They may also reflect the effect of resonance-driven commensurabilities in the various systems.
