= List of minor planets: 455001–456000 =

The following is a partial list of minor planets, running from minor-planet number 455001 through 456000, inclusive. The primary data for this and other partial lists is based on JPL's "Small-Body Orbital Elements" and data available from the Minor Planet Center. Critical list information is also provided by the MPC, unless otherwise specified from Lowell Observatory. A detailed description of the table's columns and additional sources are given on the main page including a complete list of every page in this series, and a statistical break-up on the dynamical classification of minor planets.

Also see the summary list of all named bodies in numerical and alphabetical order, and the corresponding naming citations for the number range of this particular list. New namings may only be added to this list after official publication, as the preannouncement of names is condemned by the Working Group for Small Bodies Nomenclature of the International Astronomical Union.

| Near-Earth obj. | MBA (inner) | MBA (outer) | Centaur |
| Mars-crosser | MBA (middle) | Jupiter trojan | Trans-Neptunian obj. |
| Unclassified |

== 455001–455100 ==
| Designation | | | Discovery | | | Properties | | Ref |
| Permanent | Provisional | Named after | Date | Site | Discoverer(s) | Category | Diam. | Ref |
|---|---|---|---|---|---|---|---|---|
| 455001 | 2015 TQ_{248} | — | October 6, 1999 | Kitt Peak | Spacewatch | · | 2.7 km | MPC · JPL |
| 455002 | 2015 TT_{252} | — | October 8, 1994 | Kitt Peak | Spacewatch | · | 1.5 km | MPC · JPL |
| 455003 | 2015 TW_{252} | — | September 29, 2000 | Kitt Peak | Spacewatch | MAS | 800 m | MPC · JPL |
| 455004 | 2015 TS_{254} | — | October 30, 2005 | Mount Lemmon | Mount Lemmon Survey | KOR | 1.2 km | MPC · JPL |
| 455005 | 2015 TG_{257} | — | September 7, 2004 | Kitt Peak | Spacewatch | · | 2.1 km | MPC · JPL |
| 455006 | 2015 TL_{259} | — | October 4, 2006 | Mount Lemmon | Mount Lemmon Survey | · | 2.6 km | MPC · JPL |
| 455007 | 2015 TM_{260} | — | November 28, 2005 | Kitt Peak | Spacewatch | (883) | 720 m | MPC · JPL |
| 455008 | 2015 TV_{265} | — | January 14, 1996 | Kitt Peak | Spacewatch | · | 1.1 km | MPC · JPL |
| 455009 | 2015 TY_{265} | — | October 1, 2005 | Mount Lemmon | Mount Lemmon Survey | EOS | 1.5 km | MPC · JPL |
| 455010 | 2015 TA_{281} | — | November 3, 2004 | Kitt Peak | Spacewatch | · | 3.1 km | MPC · JPL |
| 455011 | 2015 TT_{281} | — | April 16, 2009 | Catalina | CSS | · | 2.1 km | MPC · JPL |
| 455012 | 2015 TK_{283} | — | October 28, 1994 | Kitt Peak | Spacewatch | · | 1.9 km | MPC · JPL |
| 455013 | 2015 TO_{283} | — | January 26, 2006 | Kitt Peak | Spacewatch | · | 2.3 km | MPC · JPL |
| 455014 | 2015 TK_{287} | — | December 30, 2005 | Mount Lemmon | Mount Lemmon Survey | · | 760 m | MPC · JPL |
| 455015 | 2015 TR_{288} | — | September 17, 2004 | Socorro | LINEAR | NYS | 1.1 km | MPC · JPL |
| 455016 | 2015 TA_{298} | — | March 8, 2005 | Kitt Peak | Spacewatch | · | 1.5 km | MPC · JPL |
| 455017 | 2015 TN_{298} | — | August 7, 2004 | Campo Imperatore | CINEOS | · | 2.3 km | MPC · JPL |
| 455018 | 2015 TR_{303} | — | December 7, 1999 | Kitt Peak | Spacewatch | · | 2.8 km | MPC · JPL |
| 455019 | 2015 TF_{306} | — | December 2, 2010 | Mount Lemmon | Mount Lemmon Survey | EOS | 2.5 km | MPC · JPL |
| 455020 | 2015 TG_{315} | — | March 13, 2007 | Mount Lemmon | Mount Lemmon Survey | · | 4.0 km | MPC · JPL |
| 455021 | 2015 TV_{321} | — | June 16, 2007 | Kitt Peak | Spacewatch | · | 1.2 km | MPC · JPL |
| 455022 | 2015 TD_{322} | — | May 1, 2003 | Kitt Peak | Spacewatch | · | 1.3 km | MPC · JPL |
| 455023 | 2015 TV_{325} | — | January 26, 2007 | Kitt Peak | Spacewatch | · | 3.5 km | MPC · JPL |
| 455024 | 2015 TD_{328} | — | May 27, 2003 | Kitt Peak | Spacewatch | · | 3.2 km | MPC · JPL |
| 455025 | 2015 TQ_{328} | — | December 12, 1999 | Kitt Peak | Spacewatch | KON | 2.2 km | MPC · JPL |
| 455026 | 2015 TS_{334} | — | May 13, 1997 | Kitt Peak | Spacewatch | · | 2.0 km | MPC · JPL |
| 455027 | 2015 TQ_{335} | — | February 3, 2012 | Mount Lemmon | Mount Lemmon Survey | VER | 2.8 km | MPC · JPL |
| 455028 | 2015 TT_{336} | — | September 27, 2000 | Kitt Peak | Spacewatch | MAS | 930 m | MPC · JPL |
| 455029 | 2015 TC_{337} | — | November 18, 2003 | Kitt Peak | Spacewatch | · | 940 m | MPC · JPL |
| 455030 | 2015 TO_{339} | — | December 10, 2004 | Socorro | LINEAR | · | 4.3 km | MPC · JPL |
| 455031 | 2015 TQ_{343} | — | October 25, 2005 | Kitt Peak | Spacewatch | EOS | 1.7 km | MPC · JPL |
| 455032 | 2015 TN_{346} | — | March 26, 2007 | Mount Lemmon | Mount Lemmon Survey | · | 2.7 km | MPC · JPL |
| 455033 | 2015 TH_{348} | — | September 11, 2010 | Mount Lemmon | Mount Lemmon Survey | · | 2.4 km | MPC · JPL |
| 455034 | 2015 TL_{349} | — | March 16, 2007 | Kitt Peak | Spacewatch | · | 730 m | MPC · JPL |
| 455035 | 2015 TX_{349} | — | November 18, 2008 | Kitt Peak | Spacewatch | · | 1.5 km | MPC · JPL |
| 455036 | 2015 TY_{349} | — | February 17, 2007 | Kitt Peak | Spacewatch | · | 2.4 km | MPC · JPL |
| 455037 | 2015 UP | — | May 17, 2010 | WISE | WISE | DOR | 1.9 km | MPC · JPL |
| 455038 | 2015 UY_{5} | — | February 7, 2006 | Kitt Peak | Spacewatch | · | 2.7 km | MPC · JPL |
| 455039 | 2015 UC_{6} | — | November 1, 2000 | Socorro | LINEAR | · | 3.3 km | MPC · JPL |
| 455040 | 2015 UO_{6} | — | February 10, 2008 | Catalina | CSS | · | 2.1 km | MPC · JPL |
| 455041 | 2015 UY_{6} | — | November 4, 2004 | Catalina | CSS | · | 1.1 km | MPC · JPL |
| 455042 | 2015 UA_{7} | — | December 5, 2005 | Kitt Peak | Spacewatch | · | 2.4 km | MPC · JPL |
| 455043 | 2015 UD_{7} | — | November 27, 2010 | Mount Lemmon | Mount Lemmon Survey | EOS | 2.1 km | MPC · JPL |
| 455044 | 2015 UO_{7} | — | December 6, 2010 | Catalina | CSS | · | 2.5 km | MPC · JPL |
| 455045 | 2015 UR_{7} | — | September 7, 2004 | Kitt Peak | Spacewatch | · | 2.8 km | MPC · JPL |
| 455046 | 2015 UU_{7} | — | September 22, 1995 | Kitt Peak | Spacewatch | · | 1.9 km | MPC · JPL |
| 455047 | 2015 UY_{9} | — | October 30, 2005 | Kitt Peak | Spacewatch | · | 690 m | MPC · JPL |
| 455048 | 2015 UC_{10} | — | October 8, 2004 | Kitt Peak | Spacewatch | · | 1.3 km | MPC · JPL |
| 455049 | 2015 UV_{10} | — | October 1, 2005 | Mount Lemmon | Mount Lemmon Survey | · | 1.8 km | MPC · JPL |
| 455050 | 2015 UO_{11} | — | April 11, 2010 | Mount Lemmon | Mount Lemmon Survey | · | 1.3 km | MPC · JPL |
| 455051 | 2015 US_{11} | — | September 25, 2006 | Kitt Peak | Spacewatch | · | 1.8 km | MPC · JPL |
| 455052 | 2015 UW_{11} | — | August 18, 2006 | Kitt Peak | Spacewatch | · | 1.4 km | MPC · JPL |
| 455053 | 2015 UO_{12} | — | October 12, 2007 | Kitt Peak | Spacewatch | (5) | 760 m | MPC · JPL |
| 455054 | 2015 UF_{15} | — | October 25, 2005 | Kitt Peak | Spacewatch | · | 590 m | MPC · JPL |
| 455055 | 2015 UF_{16} | — | October 23, 2008 | Kitt Peak | Spacewatch | V | 550 m | MPC · JPL |
| 455056 | 2015 UM_{16} | — | September 29, 2008 | Catalina | CSS | · | 850 m | MPC · JPL |
| 455057 | 2015 UH_{19} | — | January 12, 2002 | Kitt Peak | Spacewatch | · | 1.4 km | MPC · JPL |
| 455058 | 2015 UP_{19} | — | January 25, 2009 | Kitt Peak | Spacewatch | · | 890 m | MPC · JPL |
| 455059 | 2015 UN_{22} | — | November 9, 1999 | Socorro | LINEAR | · | 2.8 km | MPC · JPL |
| 455060 | 2015 UF_{26} | — | October 4, 2006 | Mount Lemmon | Mount Lemmon Survey | EUN | 1.7 km | MPC · JPL |
| 455061 | 2015 UN_{26} | — | June 26, 2011 | Mount Lemmon | Mount Lemmon Survey | (6769) | 1.1 km | MPC · JPL |
| 455062 | 2015 UC_{31} | — | April 28, 2008 | Mount Lemmon | Mount Lemmon Survey | · | 1.8 km | MPC · JPL |
| 455063 | 2015 UE_{31} | — | April 6, 2008 | Mount Lemmon | Mount Lemmon Survey | · | 1.8 km | MPC · JPL |
| 455064 | 2015 UG_{36} | — | November 20, 2001 | Socorro | LINEAR | · | 1.8 km | MPC · JPL |
| 455065 | 2015 UG_{37} | — | February 14, 2005 | Kitt Peak | Spacewatch | CYB | 5.0 km | MPC · JPL |
| 455066 | 2015 UY_{37} | — | September 11, 2004 | Kitt Peak | Spacewatch | THM | 2.0 km | MPC · JPL |
| 455067 | 2015 UW_{38} | — | April 3, 2008 | Mount Lemmon | Mount Lemmon Survey | · | 910 m | MPC · JPL |
| 455068 | 2015 UX_{41} | — | September 19, 2006 | Kitt Peak | Spacewatch | · | 2.0 km | MPC · JPL |
| 455069 | 2015 UE_{42} | — | January 31, 2006 | Kitt Peak | Spacewatch | VER | 2.3 km | MPC · JPL |
| 455070 | 2015 UV_{42} | — | February 2, 2006 | Mount Lemmon | Mount Lemmon Survey | · | 1.1 km | MPC · JPL |
| 455071 | 2015 UP_{43} | — | May 16, 2007 | Mount Lemmon | Mount Lemmon Survey | VER | 2.7 km | MPC · JPL |
| 455072 | 2015 UO_{44} | — | December 14, 2001 | Socorro | LINEAR | · | 970 m | MPC · JPL |
| 455073 | 2015 UQ_{44} | — | September 6, 2008 | Catalina | CSS | CYB | 4.7 km | MPC · JPL |
| 455074 | 2015 UT_{44} | — | November 10, 2004 | Kitt Peak | Spacewatch | · | 3.8 km | MPC · JPL |
| 455075 | 2015 UX_{47} | — | February 21, 2006 | Catalina | CSS | VER | 4.1 km | MPC · JPL |
| 455076 | 2015 UD_{49} | — | December 27, 2005 | Kitt Peak | Spacewatch | · | 3.4 km | MPC · JPL |
| 455077 | 2015 UH_{50} | — | October 23, 2006 | Mount Lemmon | Mount Lemmon Survey | · | 3.3 km | MPC · JPL |
| 455078 | 2015 UY_{50} | — | February 10, 1999 | Kitt Peak | Spacewatch | · | 870 m | MPC · JPL |
| 455079 | 2015 UU_{51} | — | February 14, 2010 | Mount Lemmon | Mount Lemmon Survey | · | 1.0 km | MPC · JPL |
| 455080 | 2015 UB_{53} | — | September 3, 2007 | Catalina | CSS | · | 1.2 km | MPC · JPL |
| 455081 | 2015 UJ_{53} | — | October 25, 2005 | Kitt Peak | Spacewatch | · | 690 m | MPC · JPL |
| 455082 | 2015 UR_{53} | — | August 13, 2006 | Siding Spring | SSS | · | 2.2 km | MPC · JPL |
| 455083 | 2015 UZ_{53} | — | February 10, 1996 | Kitt Peak | Spacewatch | (5) | 1.2 km | MPC · JPL |
| 455084 | 2015 UK_{54} | — | August 21, 2006 | Kitt Peak | Spacewatch | · | 1.5 km | MPC · JPL |
| 455085 | 2015 UX_{58} | — | January 31, 2006 | Kitt Peak | Spacewatch | · | 2.4 km | MPC · JPL |
| 455086 | 2015 UG_{62} | — | December 19, 2003 | Kitt Peak | Spacewatch | · | 860 m | MPC · JPL |
| 455087 | 2015 UT_{65} | — | December 14, 2004 | Socorro | LINEAR | · | 3.1 km | MPC · JPL |
| 455088 | 2015 UF_{66} | — | January 9, 2007 | Mount Lemmon | Mount Lemmon Survey | · | 1.7 km | MPC · JPL |
| 455089 | 2015 UZ_{66} | — | July 26, 2011 | Siding Spring | SSS | PHO | 1.3 km | MPC · JPL |
| 455090 | 2015 UL_{67} | — | December 31, 2007 | Catalina | CSS | H | 620 m | MPC · JPL |
| 455091 | 2015 UB_{68} | — | September 30, 2005 | Mount Lemmon | Mount Lemmon Survey | EOS | 1.9 km | MPC · JPL |
| 455092 | 2015 UJ_{68} | — | November 30, 2011 | Kitt Peak | Spacewatch | · | 1.4 km | MPC · JPL |
| 455093 | 2015 UT_{70} | — | October 13, 2001 | Kitt Peak | Spacewatch | V | 600 m | MPC · JPL |
| 455094 | 2015 UU_{72} | — | October 7, 2004 | Socorro | LINEAR | · | 3.0 km | MPC · JPL |
| 455095 | 2015 UA_{73} | — | October 10, 2004 | Kitt Peak | Spacewatch | · | 3.4 km | MPC · JPL |
| 455096 | 2015 UR_{73} | — | February 2, 2006 | Kitt Peak | Spacewatch | · | 2.5 km | MPC · JPL |
| 455097 | 2015 UL_{74} | — | March 24, 2012 | Mount Lemmon | Mount Lemmon Survey | · | 2.1 km | MPC · JPL |
| 455098 | 2015 UP_{74} | — | November 25, 2005 | Mount Lemmon | Mount Lemmon Survey | · | 3.4 km | MPC · JPL |
| 455099 | 2015 UT_{74} | — | March 1, 2008 | Kitt Peak | Spacewatch | · | 2.3 km | MPC · JPL |
| 455100 | 2015 UC_{77} | — | January 11, 2011 | Catalina | CSS | · | 2.7 km | MPC · JPL |

== 455101–455200 ==
back to top

| Designation | | | Discovery | | | Properties | | Ref |
| Permanent | Provisional | Named after | Date | Site | Discoverer(s) | Category | Diam. | Ref |
|---|---|---|---|---|---|---|---|---|
| 455101 | 2015 UG_{77} | — | October 7, 2004 | Kitt Peak | Spacewatch | · | 980 m | MPC · JPL |
| 455102 | 2015 UK_{77} | — | November 30, 2005 | Kitt Peak | Spacewatch | · | 690 m | MPC · JPL |
| 455103 | 2015 UZ_{79} | — | January 30, 2006 | Kitt Peak | Spacewatch | · | 3.9 km | MPC · JPL |
| 455104 | 2015 UA_{81} | — | September 25, 2006 | Mount Lemmon | Mount Lemmon Survey | · | 1.8 km | MPC · JPL |
| 455105 | 2015 UE_{81} | — | July 21, 2010 | WISE | WISE | · | 1.3 km | MPC · JPL |
| 455106 | 2015 UA_{82} | — | October 13, 2004 | Kitt Peak | Spacewatch | · | 1.1 km | MPC · JPL |
| 455107 | 2015 UK_{82} | — | October 3, 1991 | Kitt Peak | Spacewatch | H | 460 m | MPC · JPL |
| 455108 | 2015 UN_{83} | — | October 22, 2005 | Kitt Peak | Spacewatch | · | 680 m | MPC · JPL |
| 455109 | 2015 VD_{4} | — | December 10, 2004 | Kitt Peak | Spacewatch | · | 4.4 km | MPC · JPL |
| 455110 | 2015 VG_{5} | — | October 9, 2007 | Catalina | CSS | · | 3.1 km | MPC · JPL |
| 455111 | 2015 VD_{6} | — | October 7, 2004 | Anderson Mesa | LONEOS | · | 3.3 km | MPC · JPL |
| 455112 | 2015 VU_{6} | — | May 6, 2008 | Mount Lemmon | Mount Lemmon Survey | · | 770 m | MPC · JPL |
| 455113 | 2015 VZ_{7} | — | December 1, 2005 | Kitt Peak | Spacewatch | · | 2.6 km | MPC · JPL |
| 455114 | 2015 VS_{24} | — | April 13, 2004 | Kitt Peak | Spacewatch | · | 790 m | MPC · JPL |
| 455115 | 2015 VD_{25} | — | November 11, 2004 | Kitt Peak | Spacewatch | NYS | 970 m | MPC · JPL |
| 455116 | 2015 VG_{25} | — | November 30, 2011 | Catalina | CSS | · | 1.6 km | MPC · JPL |
| 455117 | 2015 VB_{26} | — | October 7, 2004 | Kitt Peak | Spacewatch | · | 3.1 km | MPC · JPL |
| 455118 | 2015 VD_{26} | — | September 20, 2003 | Kitt Peak | Spacewatch | · | 3.4 km | MPC · JPL |
| 455119 | 2015 VZ_{29} | — | November 9, 2004 | Catalina | CSS | VER | 4.4 km | MPC · JPL |
| 455120 | 2015 VT_{31} | — | October 12, 1993 | Kitt Peak | Spacewatch | · | 810 m | MPC · JPL |
| 455121 | 2015 VO_{33} | — | December 3, 1999 | Kitt Peak | Spacewatch | · | 4.1 km | MPC · JPL |
| 455122 | 2015 VC_{34} | — | July 29, 2009 | Kitt Peak | Spacewatch | · | 2.4 km | MPC · JPL |
| 455123 | 2015 VF_{39} | — | September 2, 2007 | Mount Lemmon | Mount Lemmon Survey | · | 2.7 km | MPC · JPL |
| 455124 | 2015 VY_{40} | — | May 30, 2006 | Kitt Peak | Spacewatch | · | 1.4 km | MPC · JPL |
| 455125 | 2015 VY_{41} | — | December 4, 2007 | Kitt Peak | Spacewatch | · | 1.5 km | MPC · JPL |
| 455126 | 2015 VO_{72} | — | September 17, 2003 | Kitt Peak | Spacewatch | · | 2.7 km | MPC · JPL |
| 455127 | 2015 VY_{72} | — | December 30, 2000 | Socorro | LINEAR | · | 860 m | MPC · JPL |
| 455128 | 2015 VQ_{74} | — | August 23, 1998 | Kitt Peak | Spacewatch | · | 1.4 km | MPC · JPL |
| 455129 | 2015 VR_{74} | — | September 19, 2001 | Socorro | LINEAR | · | 1.5 km | MPC · JPL |
| 455130 | 2015 VU_{78} | — | October 26, 2008 | Mount Lemmon | Mount Lemmon Survey | · | 1.1 km | MPC · JPL |
| 455131 | 2015 VP_{94} | — | December 25, 2010 | Mount Lemmon | Mount Lemmon Survey | EOS | 2.3 km | MPC · JPL |
| 455132 | 2015 VD_{96} | — | October 8, 2004 | Socorro | LINEAR | · | 3.5 km | MPC · JPL |
| 455133 | 2015 VH_{98} | — | March 31, 2003 | Kitt Peak | Spacewatch | · | 900 m | MPC · JPL |
| 455134 | 2015 VG_{99} | — | December 30, 2008 | Mount Lemmon | Mount Lemmon Survey | · | 1.1 km | MPC · JPL |
| 455135 | 2015 VW_{99} | — | September 26, 2006 | Kitt Peak | Spacewatch | · | 1.4 km | MPC · JPL |
| 455136 | 2015 VG_{101} | — | February 9, 2008 | Mount Lemmon | Mount Lemmon Survey | · | 1.9 km | MPC · JPL |
| 455137 | 2015 VL_{103} | — | April 22, 2011 | Kitt Peak | Spacewatch | · | 800 m | MPC · JPL |
| 455138 | 2015 VW_{104} | — | October 17, 2009 | Mount Lemmon | Mount Lemmon Survey | · | 3.5 km | MPC · JPL |
| 455139 | 2015 VO_{106} | — | March 27, 2008 | Mount Lemmon | Mount Lemmon Survey | · | 2.4 km | MPC · JPL |
| 455140 | 2015 VP_{107} | — | September 11, 2004 | Socorro | LINEAR | · | 3.1 km | MPC · JPL |
| 455141 | 2015 VE_{113} | — | November 17, 2011 | Mount Lemmon | Mount Lemmon Survey | · | 1.4 km | MPC · JPL |
| 455142 | 2015 VV_{113} | — | December 10, 2004 | Socorro | LINEAR | · | 3.1 km | MPC · JPL |
| 455143 | 2015 VF_{119} | — | October 25, 2005 | Kitt Peak | Spacewatch | · | 2.3 km | MPC · JPL |
| 455144 | 2015 VP_{124} | — | September 9, 2004 | Socorro | LINEAR | · | 2.2 km | MPC · JPL |
| 455145 | 1983 QB_{1} | — | August 30, 1983 | Palomar | Gibson, J. | (2076) | 660 m | MPC · JPL |
| 455146 | 1993 FS | — | March 25, 1993 | Kitt Peak | Spacewatch | AMO · critical | 420 m | MPC · JPL |
| 455147 | 1994 AH_{9} | — | January 8, 1994 | Kitt Peak | Spacewatch | · | 860 m | MPC · JPL |
| 455148 | 1994 UG | — | October 28, 1994 | Kitt Peak | Spacewatch | APO · PHA | 210 m | MPC · JPL |
| 455149 | 1995 LF | — | June 4, 1995 | Kitt Peak | Spacewatch | critical | 240 m | MPC · JPL |
| 455150 | 1995 TC_{10} | — | October 2, 1995 | Kitt Peak | Spacewatch | · | 550 m | MPC · JPL |
| 455151 | 1995 UF_{56} | — | October 23, 1995 | Kitt Peak | Spacewatch | · | 480 m | MPC · JPL |
| 455152 | 1995 VN_{8} | — | November 14, 1995 | Kitt Peak | Spacewatch | · | 530 m | MPC · JPL |
| 455153 | 1995 YD_{15} | — | December 20, 1995 | Kitt Peak | Spacewatch | · | 660 m | MPC · JPL |
| 455154 | 1996 RQ_{19} | — | September 8, 1996 | Kitt Peak | Spacewatch | · | 1.1 km | MPC · JPL |
| 455155 | 1996 TE_{36} | — | October 11, 1996 | Kitt Peak | Spacewatch | · | 1.5 km | MPC · JPL |
| 455156 | 1996 VA_{23} | — | November 3, 1996 | Kitt Peak | Spacewatch | · | 3.8 km | MPC · JPL |
| 455157 | 1997 YM_{3} | — | December 20, 1997 | Xinglong | SCAP | T_{j} (2.77) · AMO · CYB · +1km | 1.3 km | MPC · JPL |
| 455158 | 1998 KP_{43} | — | May 29, 1998 | Kitt Peak | Spacewatch | · | 860 m | MPC · JPL |
| 455159 | 1998 MT_{22} | — | June 21, 1998 | Kitt Peak | Spacewatch | · | 1.3 km | MPC · JPL |
| 455160 | 1998 QV_{29} | — | August 23, 1998 | Xinglong | SCAP | · | 2.4 km | MPC · JPL |
| 455161 | 1998 RH_{4} | — | September 14, 1998 | Socorro | LINEAR | · | 1.4 km | MPC · JPL |
| 455162 | 1998 SE_{5} | — | September 20, 1998 | Catalina | CSS | · | 2.5 km | MPC · JPL |
| 455163 | 1998 SP_{31} | — | September 20, 1998 | Kitt Peak | Spacewatch | · | 1.1 km | MPC · JPL |
| 455164 | 1998 TN | — | October 10, 1998 | Goodricke-Pigott | R. A. Tucker | · | 1.9 km | MPC · JPL |
| 455165 | 1999 AL_{10} | — | January 14, 1999 | Catalina | CSS | · | 1.6 km | MPC · JPL |
| 455166 | 1999 AF_{16} | — | January 9, 1999 | Kitt Peak | Spacewatch | · | 1.9 km | MPC · JPL |
| 455167 | 1999 BN_{29} | — | January 18, 1999 | Kitt Peak | Spacewatch | · | 3.4 km | MPC · JPL |
| 455168 | 1999 JF_{105} | — | May 12, 1999 | Socorro | LINEAR | · | 2.2 km | MPC · JPL |
| 455169 | 1999 KQ_{6} | — | May 23, 1999 | Anderson Mesa | LONEOS | · | 1.7 km | MPC · JPL |
| 455170 | 1999 ND_{5} | — | July 14, 1999 | Socorro | LINEAR | · | 800 m | MPC · JPL |
| 455171 | 1999 OM_{4} | — | July 19, 1999 | Mauna Kea | Mauna Kea | cubewano (cold) | 139 km | MPC · JPL |
| 455172 | 1999 QJ | — | August 17, 1999 | Siding Spring | R. H. McNaught | · | 2.3 km | MPC · JPL |
| 455173 | 1999 TF_{137} | — | October 6, 1999 | Socorro | LINEAR | · | 790 m | MPC · JPL |
| 455174 | 1999 TD_{207} | — | October 14, 1999 | Socorro | LINEAR | · | 1.3 km | MPC · JPL |
| 455175 | 1999 UK_{11} | — | October 30, 1999 | Kitt Peak | Spacewatch | · | 1.2 km | MPC · JPL |
| 455176 | 1999 VF_{22} | — | November 10, 1999 | Catalina | CSS | APO · PHA | 260 m | MPC · JPL |
| 455177 | 1999 VJ_{42} | — | November 4, 1999 | Kitt Peak | Spacewatch | · | 1.4 km | MPC · JPL |
| 455178 | 1999 VL_{231} | — | November 15, 1999 | Kitt Peak | Spacewatch | · | 970 m | MPC · JPL |
| 455179 | 2000 AQ_{221} | — | January 8, 2000 | Kitt Peak | Spacewatch | · | 2.1 km | MPC · JPL |
| 455180 | 2000 BE_{40} | — | January 28, 2000 | Kitt Peak | Spacewatch | H | 550 m | MPC · JPL |
| 455181 | 2000 DX_{90} | — | February 27, 2000 | Kitt Peak | Spacewatch | · | 1.0 km | MPC · JPL |
| 455182 | 2000 DE_{108} | — | February 28, 2000 | Socorro | LINEAR | · | 2.1 km | MPC · JPL |
| 455183 | 2000 DR_{115} | — | February 28, 2000 | Kitt Peak | Spacewatch | · | 2.2 km | MPC · JPL |
| 455184 | 2000 ED_{14} | — | March 4, 2000 | Socorro | LINEAR | ATE · PHA | 200 m | MPC · JPL |
| 455185 | 2000 EB_{107} | — | March 12, 2000 | Socorro | LINEAR | T_{j} (2.83) · AMO +1km | 600 m | MPC · JPL |
| 455186 | 2000 ES_{115} | — | March 10, 2000 | Kitt Peak | Spacewatch | H | 540 m | MPC · JPL |
| 455187 | 2000 GX_{59} | — | April 5, 2000 | Socorro | LINEAR | · | 4.2 km | MPC · JPL |
| 455188 | 2000 NQ_{8} | — | July 5, 2000 | Kitt Peak | Spacewatch | · | 2.1 km | MPC · JPL |
| 455189 | 2000 QM_{7} | — | August 25, 2000 | Socorro | LINEAR | · | 1.4 km | MPC · JPL |
| 455190 | 2000 QE_{25} | — | August 26, 2000 | Socorro | LINEAR | · | 1.6 km | MPC · JPL |
| 455191 | 2000 QL_{110} | — | August 24, 2000 | Socorro | LINEAR | ERI | 1.4 km | MPC · JPL |
| 455192 | 2000 QN_{130} | — | August 31, 2000 | Socorro | LINEAR | AMO +1km | 1.1 km | MPC · JPL |
| 455193 | 2000 RJ_{60} | — | September 6, 2000 | Socorro | LINEAR | AMO | 700 m | MPC · JPL |
| 455194 | 2000 SZ_{48} | — | September 3, 2000 | Socorro | LINEAR | · | 1.9 km | MPC · JPL |
| 455195 | 2000 SR_{178} | — | September 28, 2000 | Socorro | LINEAR | · | 1.5 km | MPC · JPL |
| 455196 | 2000 TP_{19} | — | October 1, 2000 | Socorro | LINEAR | ERI | 1.7 km | MPC · JPL |
| 455197 | 2000 TV_{45} | — | October 1, 2000 | Socorro | LINEAR | · | 1.5 km | MPC · JPL |
| 455198 | 2000 UK_{83} | — | October 2, 2000 | Socorro | LINEAR | · | 1.1 km | MPC · JPL |
| 455199 | 2000 YK_{4} | — | December 19, 2000 | Socorro | LINEAR | AMO | 360 m | MPC · JPL |
| 455200 | 2001 BM_{12} | — | January 20, 2001 | Kitt Peak | Spacewatch | NYS | 910 m | MPC · JPL |

== 455201–455300 ==
back to top

| Designation | | | Discovery | | | Properties | | Ref |
| Permanent | Provisional | Named after | Date | Site | Discoverer(s) | Category | Diam. | Ref |
|---|---|---|---|---|---|---|---|---|
| 455201 | 2001 CW_{19} | — | February 2, 2001 | Prescott | P. G. Comba | H | 500 m | MPC · JPL |
| 455202 | 2001 DN_{36} | — | February 19, 2001 | Socorro | LINEAR | · | 1.3 km | MPC · JPL |
| 455203 | 2001 DA_{54} | — | February 21, 2001 | Nogales | Tenagra II | · | 960 m | MPC · JPL |
| 455204 | 2001 FY_{6} | — | March 20, 2001 | Haleakala | NEAT | · | 1.2 km | MPC · JPL |
| 455205 | 2001 FV_{110} | — | March 18, 2001 | Socorro | LINEAR | H | 500 m | MPC · JPL |
| 455206 | 2001 FE_{193} | — | March 27, 2001 | Kitt Peak | Allen, R. L., Bernstein, G., R. Malhotra | cubewano (cold) | 137 km | MPC · JPL |
| 455207 Kellyyoder | 2001 FU_{201} | Kellyyoder | March 21, 2001 | Kitt Peak | SKADS | EOS | 1.6 km | MPC · JPL |
| 455208 | 2001 FY_{211} | — | March 21, 2001 | Kitt Peak | SKADS | · | 660 m | MPC · JPL |
| 455209 | 2001 KT_{76} | — | May 24, 2001 | Cerro Tololo | M. W. Buie | cubewano (cold) · critical | 141 km | MPC · JPL |
| 455210 | 2001 MR_{17} | — | June 27, 2001 | Kitt Peak | Spacewatch | · | 760 m | MPC · JPL |
| 455211 | 2001 MS_{18} | — | June 28, 2001 | Haleakala | NEAT | · | 750 m | MPC · JPL |
| 455212 | 2001 OG_{62} | — | July 21, 2001 | Haleakala | NEAT | · | 3.8 km | MPC · JPL |
| 455213 | 2001 OE_{84} | — | July 27, 2001 | Palomar | NEAT | AMO +1km · fast | 830 m | MPC · JPL |
| 455214 | 2001 PJ_{18} | — | August 9, 2001 | Palomar | NEAT | · | 1.3 km | MPC · JPL |
| 455215 | 2001 PM_{35} | — | August 11, 2001 | Palomar | NEAT | · | 1.9 km | MPC · JPL |
| 455216 | 2001 QB_{5} | — | July 27, 2001 | Anderson Mesa | LONEOS | EUN | 1.3 km | MPC · JPL |
| 455217 | 2001 QD_{154} | — | August 28, 2001 | Ondřejov | M. Wolf, L. Kotková | · | 760 m | MPC · JPL |
| 455218 | 2001 QL_{196} | — | August 22, 2001 | Haleakala | NEAT | · | 850 m | MPC · JPL |
| 455219 | 2001 QZ_{225} | — | August 24, 2001 | Anderson Mesa | LONEOS | · | 1.7 km | MPC · JPL |
| 455220 | 2001 QB_{281} | — | August 19, 2001 | Socorro | LINEAR | H | 700 m | MPC · JPL |
| 455221 | 2001 QJ_{331} | — | August 27, 2001 | Palomar | S. F. Hönig | LIX | 4.0 km | MPC · JPL |
| 455222 | 2001 RY_{29} | — | September 7, 2001 | Socorro | LINEAR | · | 530 m | MPC · JPL |
| 455223 | 2001 RB_{30} | — | September 7, 2001 | Socorro | LINEAR | · | 1.6 km | MPC · JPL |
| 455224 | 2001 RW_{47} | — | September 14, 2001 | Palomar | NEAT | · | 810 m | MPC · JPL |
| 455225 | 2001 RT_{62} | — | September 12, 2001 | Socorro | LINEAR | · | 580 m | MPC · JPL |
| 455226 | 2001 RR_{63} | — | September 11, 2001 | Kitt Peak | Spacewatch | · | 1.7 km | MPC · JPL |
| 455227 | 2001 RR_{67} | — | September 10, 2001 | Socorro | LINEAR | EUN | 1.4 km | MPC · JPL |
| 455228 | 2001 SZ_{13} | — | August 25, 2001 | Kitt Peak | Spacewatch | · | 550 m | MPC · JPL |
| 455229 | 2001 SL_{14} | — | September 16, 2001 | Socorro | LINEAR | · | 1.8 km | MPC · JPL |
| 455230 | 2001 SU_{14} | — | August 27, 2001 | Anderson Mesa | LONEOS | · | 610 m | MPC · JPL |
| 455231 | 2001 SX_{111} | — | September 20, 2001 | Socorro | LINEAR | · | 930 m | MPC · JPL |
| 455232 | 2001 SX_{125} | — | September 16, 2001 | Socorro | LINEAR | · | 820 m | MPC · JPL |
| 455233 | 2001 SB_{137} | — | September 16, 2001 | Socorro | LINEAR | · | 520 m | MPC · JPL |
| 455234 | 2001 SX_{138} | — | September 16, 2001 | Socorro | LINEAR | · | 500 m | MPC · JPL |
| 455235 | 2001 SA_{143} | — | September 16, 2001 | Socorro | LINEAR | · | 650 m | MPC · JPL |
| 455236 | 2001 SG_{149} | — | September 17, 2001 | Socorro | LINEAR | · | 690 m | MPC · JPL |
| 455237 | 2001 SX_{179} | — | September 7, 2001 | Socorro | LINEAR | · | 1.7 km | MPC · JPL |
| 455238 | 2001 SZ_{179} | — | September 19, 2001 | Socorro | LINEAR | · | 4.1 km | MPC · JPL |
| 455239 | 2001 SR_{203} | — | September 19, 2001 | Socorro | LINEAR | · | 550 m | MPC · JPL |
| 455240 | 2001 SJ_{208} | — | September 11, 2001 | Anderson Mesa | LONEOS | · | 750 m | MPC · JPL |
| 455241 | 2001 SY_{212} | — | September 19, 2001 | Socorro | LINEAR | · | 2.0 km | MPC · JPL |
| 455242 | 2001 SV_{223} | — | September 19, 2001 | Socorro | LINEAR | · | 1.5 km | MPC · JPL |
| 455243 | 2001 SD_{225} | — | September 11, 2001 | Kitt Peak | Spacewatch | CYB | 4.1 km | MPC · JPL |
| 455244 | 2001 SS_{228} | — | September 19, 2001 | Socorro | LINEAR | H | 640 m | MPC · JPL |
| 455245 | 2001 SJ_{236} | — | September 19, 2001 | Socorro | LINEAR | · | 1.6 km | MPC · JPL |
| 455246 | 2001 SO_{283} | — | September 20, 2001 | Kitt Peak | Spacewatch | · | 2.0 km | MPC · JPL |
| 455247 | 2001 SL_{323} | — | August 16, 2001 | Socorro | LINEAR | · | 2.0 km | MPC · JPL |
| 455248 | 2001 SV_{325} | — | September 17, 2001 | Palomar | NEAT | · | 1.6 km | MPC · JPL |
| 455249 | 2001 SW_{348} | — | September 22, 2001 | Palomar | NEAT | · | 1.1 km | MPC · JPL |
| 455250 | 2001 TC_{20} | — | October 9, 2001 | Socorro | LINEAR | · | 2.3 km | MPC · JPL |
| 455251 | 2001 TD_{26} | — | October 14, 2001 | Socorro | LINEAR | · | 700 m | MPC · JPL |
| 455252 | 2001 TV_{95} | — | September 11, 2001 | Socorro | LINEAR | · | 1.4 km | MPC · JPL |
| 455253 | 2001 TH_{103} | — | October 14, 2001 | Socorro | LINEAR | H | 590 m | MPC · JPL |
| 455254 | 2001 TT_{159} | — | October 11, 2001 | Socorro | LINEAR | JUN | 1.3 km | MPC · JPL |
| 455255 | 2001 TV_{160} | — | October 15, 2001 | Kitt Peak | Spacewatch | · | 570 m | MPC · JPL |
| 455256 | 2001 TK_{166} | — | October 15, 2001 | Socorro | LINEAR | · | 1.0 km | MPC · JPL |
| 455257 | 2001 TR_{183} | — | October 14, 2001 | Socorro | LINEAR | AEO | 850 m | MPC · JPL |
| 455258 | 2001 TF_{187} | — | October 14, 2001 | Socorro | LINEAR | (2076) | 750 m | MPC · JPL |
| 455259 | 2001 UP_{115} | — | October 13, 2001 | Kitt Peak | Spacewatch | · | 1.4 km | MPC · JPL |
| 455260 | 2001 UQ_{156} | — | October 23, 2001 | Socorro | LINEAR | · | 1.7 km | MPC · JPL |
| 455261 | 2001 UO_{178} | — | October 23, 2001 | Palomar | NEAT | · | 690 m | MPC · JPL |
| 455262 | 2001 UZ_{181} | — | October 16, 2001 | Socorro | LINEAR | H | 610 m | MPC · JPL |
| 455263 | 2001 UM_{221} | — | October 23, 2001 | Socorro | LINEAR | · | 730 m | MPC · JPL |
| 455264 | 2001 UK_{231} | — | October 16, 2001 | Palomar | NEAT | · | 1.3 km | MPC · JPL |
| 455265 | 2001 VS_{4} | — | November 10, 2001 | Socorro | LINEAR | · | 1.0 km | MPC · JPL |
| 455266 | 2001 VZ_{24} | — | November 9, 2001 | Socorro | LINEAR | · | 2.0 km | MPC · JPL |
| 455267 | 2001 VM_{82} | — | October 24, 2001 | Socorro | LINEAR | · | 630 m | MPC · JPL |
| 455268 | 2001 VO_{83} | — | November 10, 2001 | Socorro | LINEAR | · | 840 m | MPC · JPL |
| 455269 | 2001 WB_{66} | — | October 21, 2001 | Socorro | LINEAR | EUN | 1.2 km | MPC · JPL |
| 455270 | 2001 WK_{96} | — | November 17, 2001 | Kitt Peak | Spacewatch | · | 1.5 km | MPC · JPL |
| 455271 | 2001 XS_{86} | — | December 11, 2001 | Socorro | LINEAR | · | 3.4 km | MPC · JPL |
| 455272 | 2001 XZ_{138} | — | November 20, 2001 | Socorro | LINEAR | · | 2.0 km | MPC · JPL |
| 455273 | 2001 XO_{140} | — | December 14, 2001 | Socorro | LINEAR | · | 1.5 km | MPC · JPL |
| 455274 | 2001 XH_{143} | — | December 14, 2001 | Socorro | LINEAR | EUN | 1.3 km | MPC · JPL |
| 455275 | 2001 XN_{150} | — | December 14, 2001 | Socorro | LINEAR | · | 1.8 km | MPC · JPL |
| 455276 | 2001 XW_{220} | — | November 20, 2001 | Socorro | LINEAR | · | 760 m | MPC · JPL |
| 455277 | 2001 XY_{232} | — | December 15, 2001 | Socorro | LINEAR | · | 720 m | MPC · JPL |
| 455278 | 2001 YY_{2} | — | December 17, 2001 | Socorro | LINEAR | H | 650 m | MPC · JPL |
| 455279 | 2001 YE_{12} | — | November 9, 2001 | Socorro | LINEAR | · | 1.7 km | MPC · JPL |
| 455280 | 2001 YX_{27} | — | December 14, 2001 | Kitt Peak | Spacewatch | · | 1.5 km | MPC · JPL |
| 455281 | 2001 YS_{59} | — | December 18, 2001 | Socorro | LINEAR | · | 1.8 km | MPC · JPL |
| 455282 | 2001 YW_{157} | — | December 18, 2001 | Apache Point | SDSS | V | 550 m | MPC · JPL |
| 455283 | 2002 AF_{5} | — | December 18, 2001 | Socorro | LINEAR | PHO | 950 m | MPC · JPL |
| 455284 | 2002 AG_{37} | — | January 9, 2002 | Socorro | LINEAR | PHO | 990 m | MPC · JPL |
| 455285 | 2002 AB_{56} | — | January 9, 2002 | Socorro | LINEAR | · | 730 m | MPC · JPL |
| 455286 | 2002 CL_{44} | — | February 10, 2002 | Socorro | LINEAR | H | 560 m | MPC · JPL |
| 455287 | 2002 CA_{45} | — | January 19, 2002 | Kitt Peak | Spacewatch | GEF | 1.1 km | MPC · JPL |
| 455288 | 2002 CG_{115} | — | February 10, 2002 | Socorro | LINEAR | · | 740 m | MPC · JPL |
| 455289 | 2002 CF_{118} | — | February 14, 2002 | Desert Eagle | W. K. Y. Yeung | PHO | 1.1 km | MPC · JPL |
| 455290 | 2002 CG_{118} | — | February 11, 2002 | Socorro | LINEAR | · | 1.8 km | MPC · JPL |
| 455291 | 2002 CL_{140} | — | February 8, 2002 | Socorro | LINEAR | PHO | 820 m | MPC · JPL |
| 455292 | 2002 CP_{199} | — | February 10, 2002 | Socorro | LINEAR | · | 1.9 km | MPC · JPL |
| 455293 | 2002 CU_{224} | — | February 11, 2002 | Socorro | LINEAR | · | 2.2 km | MPC · JPL |
| 455294 | 2002 CM_{262} | — | February 6, 2002 | Kitt Peak | M. W. Buie | · | 820 m | MPC · JPL |
| 455295 | 2002 CM_{266} | — | February 7, 2002 | Kitt Peak | Spacewatch | NYS | 610 m | MPC · JPL |
| 455296 | 2002 CE_{311} | — | February 10, 2002 | Socorro | LINEAR | · | 730 m | MPC · JPL |
| 455297 | 2002 DK | — | February 16, 2002 | Bohyunsan | Jeon, Y.-B., Lee, B.-C. | · | 730 m | MPC · JPL |
| 455298 | 2002 EM_{4} | — | February 20, 2002 | Kitt Peak | Spacewatch | DOR | 2.1 km | MPC · JPL |
| 455299 | 2002 EL_{6} | — | March 10, 2002 | Drebach | ~Knöfel, A. | APO +1km · PHA | 540 m | MPC · JPL |
| 455300 | 2002 EV_{10} | — | March 14, 2002 | Socorro | LINEAR | · | 900 m | MPC · JPL |

== 455301–455400 ==
back to top

| Designation | | | Discovery | | | Properties | | Ref |
| Permanent | Provisional | Named after | Date | Site | Discoverer(s) | Category | Diam. | Ref |
|---|---|---|---|---|---|---|---|---|
| 455301 | 2002 EO_{44} | — | March 9, 2002 | Palomar | NEAT | · | 770 m | MPC · JPL |
| 455302 | 2002 EA_{48} | — | March 12, 2002 | Palomar | NEAT | · | 640 m | MPC · JPL |
| 455303 | 2002 EW_{52} | — | March 9, 2002 | Socorro | LINEAR | · | 950 m | MPC · JPL |
| 455304 | 2002 EX_{66} | — | March 13, 2002 | Socorro | LINEAR | · | 670 m | MPC · JPL |
| 455305 | 2002 EP_{105} | — | March 9, 2002 | Anderson Mesa | LONEOS | · | 2.9 km | MPC · JPL |
| 455306 | 2002 EZ_{118} | — | January 13, 2002 | Kitt Peak | Spacewatch | · | 1.9 km | MPC · JPL |
| 455307 | 2002 EA_{131} | — | March 12, 2002 | Palomar | NEAT | · | 920 m | MPC · JPL |
| 455308 | 2002 FF | — | March 16, 2002 | Haleakala | NEAT | · | 930 m | MPC · JPL |
| 455309 | 2002 FF_{28} | — | March 20, 2002 | Kitt Peak | Spacewatch | · | 760 m | MPC · JPL |
| 455310 | 2002 GL_{3} | — | April 4, 2002 | Palomar | NEAT | PHO | 800 m | MPC · JPL |
| 455311 | 2002 GO_{4} | — | April 9, 2002 | Socorro | LINEAR | · | 580 m | MPC · JPL |
| 455312 | 2002 GK_{35} | — | April 2, 2002 | Kitt Peak | Spacewatch | · | 890 m | MPC · JPL |
| 455313 | 2002 GW_{107} | — | April 11, 2002 | Socorro | LINEAR | · | 740 m | MPC · JPL |
| 455314 | 2002 GD_{123} | — | April 10, 2002 | Socorro | LINEAR | · | 700 m | MPC · JPL |
| 455315 | 2002 GE_{127} | — | April 12, 2002 | Palomar | NEAT | · | 2.3 km | MPC · JPL |
| 455316 | 2002 GS_{152} | — | April 12, 2002 | Palomar | NEAT | · | 1.8 km | MPC · JPL |
| 455317 | 2002 HA_{13} | — | April 22, 2002 | Socorro | LINEAR | PHO | 1.1 km | MPC · JPL |
| 455318 | 2002 HD_{14} | — | April 30, 2002 | Palomar | NEAT | · | 900 m | MPC · JPL |
| 455319 | 2002 KM_{8} | — | April 10, 2002 | Socorro | LINEAR | · | 1.2 km | MPC · JPL |
| 455320 | 2002 LQ_{24} | — | May 16, 2002 | Socorro | LINEAR | T_{j} (2.95) | 3.2 km | MPC · JPL |
| 455321 | 2002 NA_{1} | — | July 5, 2002 | Kitt Peak | Spacewatch | · | 2.8 km | MPC · JPL |
| 455322 | 2002 NX_{18} | — | July 9, 2002 | Socorro | LINEAR | AMO +1km | 1.1 km | MPC · JPL |
| 455323 | 2002 NS_{46} | — | July 13, 2002 | Haleakala | NEAT | · | 5.8 km | MPC · JPL |
| 455324 | 2002 NL_{55} | — | July 9, 2002 | Socorro | LINEAR | · | 3.4 km | MPC · JPL |
| 455325 | 2002 OH_{25} | — | July 29, 2002 | Palomar | S. F. Hönig | · | 2.8 km | MPC · JPL |
| 455326 | 2002 OU_{26} | — | July 19, 2002 | Palomar | NEAT | · | 3.6 km | MPC · JPL |
| 455327 | 2002 OP_{28} | — | July 21, 2002 | Palomar | NEAT | H | 530 m | MPC · JPL |
| 455328 | 2002 OV_{32} | — | July 20, 2002 | Palomar | NEAT | · | 1.9 km | MPC · JPL |
| 455329 | 2002 PO_{63} | — | August 12, 2002 | Teide | Teide | T_{j} (2.97) | 5.0 km | MPC · JPL |
| 455330 | 2002 PX_{79} | — | August 3, 2002 | Palomar | NEAT | · | 3.6 km | MPC · JPL |
| 455331 | 2002 PP_{110} | — | August 13, 2002 | Socorro | LINEAR | · | 1.8 km | MPC · JPL |
| 455332 | 2002 PX_{167} | — | August 8, 2002 | Palomar | NEAT | · | 960 m | MPC · JPL |
| 455333 | 2002 QZ_{65} | — | August 18, 2002 | Palomar | NEAT | TIR | 3.2 km | MPC · JPL |
| 455334 | 2002 QE_{86} | — | August 17, 2002 | Palomar | NEAT | (5) | 910 m | MPC · JPL |
| 455335 | 2002 QR_{116} | — | August 18, 2002 | Palomar | NEAT | · | 540 m | MPC · JPL |
| 455336 | 2002 QW_{119} | — | August 19, 2002 | Palomar | NEAT | (5) | 1.0 km | MPC · JPL |
| 455337 | 2002 QW_{122} | — | August 27, 2002 | Palomar | NEAT | · | 3.0 km | MPC · JPL |
| 455338 | 2002 QB_{136} | — | August 16, 2002 | Palomar | NEAT | · | 3.4 km | MPC · JPL |
| 455339 | 2002 RF_{4} | — | September 3, 2002 | Palomar | NEAT | · | 1.3 km | MPC · JPL |
| 455340 | 2002 RO_{6} | — | September 1, 2002 | Haleakala | NEAT | EOS | 2.5 km | MPC · JPL |
| 455341 | 2002 RZ_{16} | — | September 5, 2002 | Socorro | LINEAR | · | 1.3 km | MPC · JPL |
| 455342 | 2002 RG_{19} | — | September 4, 2002 | Anderson Mesa | LONEOS | PHO | 1.2 km | MPC · JPL |
| 455343 | 2002 RQ_{38} | — | September 5, 2002 | Anderson Mesa | LONEOS | · | 930 m | MPC · JPL |
| 455344 | 2002 RK_{53} | — | September 5, 2002 | Socorro | LINEAR | · | 1.2 km | MPC · JPL |
| 455345 | 2002 RS_{59} | — | September 5, 2002 | Socorro | LINEAR | · | 1.2 km | MPC · JPL |
| 455346 | 2002 RO_{78} | — | September 5, 2002 | Socorro | LINEAR | · | 1.1 km | MPC · JPL |
| 455347 | 2002 RJ_{97} | — | August 12, 2002 | Socorro | LINEAR | · | 3.7 km | MPC · JPL |
| 455348 | 2002 RR_{103} | — | September 5, 2002 | Socorro | LINEAR | T_{j} (2.98) | 4.9 km | MPC · JPL |
| 455349 | 2002 RH_{112} | — | September 5, 2002 | Campo Imperatore | CINEOS | · | 970 m | MPC · JPL |
| 455350 | 2002 RL_{115} | — | September 6, 2002 | Socorro | LINEAR | · | 880 m | MPC · JPL |
| 455351 | 2002 RP_{132} | — | September 11, 2002 | Palomar | NEAT | · | 2.9 km | MPC · JPL |
| 455352 | 2002 RV_{173} | — | September 13, 2002 | Palomar | NEAT | · | 1.0 km | MPC · JPL |
| 455353 | 2002 RO_{237} | — | September 15, 2002 | Palomar | R. Matson | · | 3.9 km | MPC · JPL |
| 455354 | 2002 RC_{247} | — | September 15, 2002 | Palomar | NEAT | · | 2.3 km | MPC · JPL |
| 455355 | 2002 RP_{252} | — | September 3, 2002 | Palomar | NEAT | · | 3.4 km | MPC · JPL |
| 455356 | 2002 RA_{253} | — | September 14, 2002 | Palomar | NEAT | · | 2.4 km | MPC · JPL |
| 455357 | 2002 RK_{264} | — | September 13, 2002 | Palomar | NEAT | · | 2.1 km | MPC · JPL |
| 455358 | 2002 SW_{46} | — | September 29, 2002 | Haleakala | NEAT | · | 1.3 km | MPC · JPL |
| 455359 | 2002 TS_{70} | — | October 3, 2002 | Palomar | NEAT | · | 1.6 km | MPC · JPL |
| 455360 | 2002 TV_{100} | — | October 4, 2002 | Socorro | LINEAR | (5) | 1.1 km | MPC · JPL |
| 455361 | 2002 TT_{104} | — | October 4, 2002 | Socorro | LINEAR | · | 1.5 km | MPC · JPL |
| 455362 | 2002 TP_{107} | — | October 4, 2002 | Campo Imperatore | CINEOS | · | 950 m | MPC · JPL |
| 455363 | 2002 TM_{117} | — | October 3, 2002 | Palomar | NEAT | · | 1.4 km | MPC · JPL |
| 455364 | 2002 TU_{158} | — | October 5, 2002 | Palomar | NEAT | · | 1.4 km | MPC · JPL |
| 455365 | 2002 TT_{161} | — | October 5, 2002 | Palomar | NEAT | THB | 3.5 km | MPC · JPL |
| 455366 | 2002 TJ_{170} | — | October 3, 2002 | Palomar | NEAT | · | 4.0 km | MPC · JPL |
| 455367 | 2002 TF_{171} | — | October 3, 2002 | Palomar | NEAT | · | 820 m | MPC · JPL |
| 455368 | 2002 TO_{177} | — | October 11, 2002 | Palomar | NEAT | · | 1.3 km | MPC · JPL |
| 455369 | 2002 TG_{202} | — | October 8, 2002 | Needville | Needville | (5) | 1.4 km | MPC · JPL |
| 455370 | 2002 TF_{205} | — | October 4, 2002 | Socorro | LINEAR | (5) | 960 m | MPC · JPL |
| 455371 | 2002 TC_{225} | — | October 8, 2002 | Anderson Mesa | LONEOS | · | 990 m | MPC · JPL |
| 455372 | 2002 TM_{281} | — | October 10, 2002 | Socorro | LINEAR | · | 1.5 km | MPC · JPL |
| 455373 | 2002 TX_{303} | — | October 4, 2002 | Apache Point | SDSS | · | 1.2 km | MPC · JPL |
| 455374 | 2002 TT_{318} | — | October 5, 2002 | Apache Point | SDSS | · | 1.0 km | MPC · JPL |
| 455375 | 2002 TQ_{342} | — | October 5, 2002 | Apache Point | SDSS | · | 3.8 km | MPC · JPL |
| 455376 | 2002 UE_{17} | — | October 31, 2002 | Socorro | LINEAR | · | 1.2 km | MPC · JPL |
| 455377 | 2002 UV_{37} | — | October 31, 2002 | Palomar | NEAT | · | 1.2 km | MPC · JPL |
| 455378 | 2002 UV_{41} | — | October 31, 2002 | Socorro | LINEAR | · | 2.0 km | MPC · JPL |
| 455379 | 2002 UO_{43} | — | October 30, 2002 | Kitt Peak | Spacewatch | · | 860 m | MPC · JPL |
| 455380 | 2002 UL_{58} | — | October 29, 2002 | Apache Point | SDSS | · | 2.8 km | MPC · JPL |
| 455381 | 2002 UT_{59} | — | October 29, 2002 | Apache Point | SDSS | · | 1.3 km | MPC · JPL |
| 455382 | 2002 VB_{15} | — | November 4, 2002 | Palomar | NEAT | H | 630 m | MPC · JPL |
| 455383 | 2002 VW_{24} | — | November 5, 2002 | Socorro | LINEAR | THB | 2.9 km | MPC · JPL |
| 455384 | 2002 VY_{45} | — | November 5, 2002 | Palomar | NEAT | · | 1.1 km | MPC · JPL |
| 455385 | 2002 VB_{85} | — | November 9, 2002 | Eskridge | Farpoint | · | 1.3 km | MPC · JPL |
| 455386 | 2002 VY_{123} | — | November 14, 2002 | Socorro | LINEAR | · | 1.4 km | MPC · JPL |
| 455387 | 2002 VO_{142} | — | November 5, 2002 | Palomar | NEAT | · | 660 m | MPC · JPL |
| 455388 | 2002 VK_{144} | — | November 4, 2002 | Palomar | NEAT | · | 940 m | MPC · JPL |
| 455389 | 2002 VG_{147} | — | November 6, 2002 | Anderson Mesa | LONEOS | BRG | 1.7 km | MPC · JPL |
| 455390 | 2002 WK | — | November 17, 2002 | Socorro | LINEAR | · | 1.8 km | MPC · JPL |
| 455391 | 2002 WE_{5} | — | November 24, 2002 | Palomar | NEAT | H | 560 m | MPC · JPL |
| 455392 | 2002 XO_{20} | — | December 2, 2002 | Socorro | LINEAR | · | 1.1 km | MPC · JPL |
| 455393 | 2002 XU_{28} | — | December 5, 2002 | Socorro | LINEAR | · | 1.6 km | MPC · JPL |
| 455394 | 2002 YP_{15} | — | December 31, 2002 | Socorro | LINEAR | · | 2.0 km | MPC · JPL |
| 455395 | 2003 AC_{17} | — | January 5, 2003 | Socorro | LINEAR | H | 630 m | MPC · JPL |
| 455396 | 2003 AB_{20} | — | January 5, 2003 | Socorro | LINEAR | · | 940 m | MPC · JPL |
| 455397 | 2003 AR_{54} | — | January 5, 2003 | Socorro | LINEAR | · | 2.0 km | MPC · JPL |
| 455398 | 2003 AW_{72} | — | January 11, 2003 | Socorro | LINEAR | · | 4.4 km | MPC · JPL |
| 455399 | 2003 BS_{12} | — | January 26, 2003 | Palomar | NEAT | · | 2.5 km | MPC · JPL |
| 455400 | 2003 BK_{21} | — | January 13, 2003 | Kitt Peak | Spacewatch | H | 560 m | MPC · JPL |

== 455401–455500 ==
back to top

| Designation | | | Discovery | | | Properties | | Ref |
| Permanent | Provisional | Named after | Date | Site | Discoverer(s) | Category | Diam. | Ref |
|---|---|---|---|---|---|---|---|---|
| 455401 | 2003 BE_{46} | — | December 31, 2002 | Socorro | LINEAR | H | 650 m | MPC · JPL |
| 455402 | 2003 BS_{52} | — | January 27, 2003 | Anderson Mesa | LONEOS | · | 2.4 km | MPC · JPL |
| 455403 | 2003 BY_{57} | — | December 31, 2002 | Socorro | LINEAR | JUN | 1.1 km | MPC · JPL |
| 455404 | 2003 BO_{75} | — | January 29, 2003 | Palomar | NEAT | H | 630 m | MPC · JPL |
| 455405 | 2003 BE_{90} | — | January 28, 2003 | Socorro | LINEAR | · | 2.0 km | MPC · JPL |
| 455406 | 2003 CL_{17} | — | December 31, 2002 | Socorro | LINEAR | · | 1.8 km | MPC · JPL |
| 455407 | 2003 ER | — | March 5, 2003 | Socorro | LINEAR | AMO | 380 m | MPC · JPL |
| 455408 | 2003 EB_{1} | — | March 3, 2003 | Haleakala | NEAT | H | 660 m | MPC · JPL |
| 455409 | 2003 EL_{47} | — | March 9, 2003 | Anderson Mesa | LONEOS | H | 710 m | MPC · JPL |
| 455410 | 2003 FG_{4} | — | March 26, 2003 | Haleakala | NEAT | · | 1.3 km | MPC · JPL |
| 455411 | 2003 FM_{4} | — | March 26, 2003 | Socorro | LINEAR | H | 700 m | MPC · JPL |
| 455412 | 2003 FX_{11} | — | March 24, 2003 | Kitt Peak | Spacewatch | · | 1.7 km | MPC · JPL |
| 455413 | 2003 FQ_{40} | — | March 25, 2003 | Palomar | NEAT | · | 2.0 km | MPC · JPL |
| 455414 | 2003 FL_{90} | — | March 29, 2003 | Anderson Mesa | LONEOS | ADE | 2.2 km | MPC · JPL |
| 455415 | 2003 GA | — | April 1, 2003 | Socorro | LINEAR | AMO | 180 m | MPC · JPL |
| 455416 | 2003 GN_{11} | — | April 1, 2003 | Kitt Peak | Spacewatch | · | 540 m | MPC · JPL |
| 455417 | 2003 GN_{39} | — | July 28, 1995 | Kitt Peak | Spacewatch | L4 | 10 km | MPC · JPL |
| 455418 | 2003 GC_{53} | — | April 10, 2003 | Kitt Peak | Spacewatch | H | 530 m | MPC · JPL |
| 455419 | 2003 GS_{56} | — | April 11, 2003 | Kitt Peak | Spacewatch | · | 1.2 km | MPC · JPL |
| 455420 | 2003 HR_{15} | — | April 23, 2003 | Socorro | LINEAR | H | 650 m | MPC · JPL |
| 455421 | 2003 HL_{23} | — | April 4, 2003 | Kitt Peak | Spacewatch | · | 1.8 km | MPC · JPL |
| 455422 | 2003 HG_{47} | — | April 28, 2003 | Socorro | LINEAR | · | 2.1 km | MPC · JPL |
| 455423 | 2003 JQ_{6} | — | May 1, 2003 | Socorro | LINEAR | PHO | 950 m | MPC · JPL |
| 455424 | 2003 KA_{10} | — | May 5, 2003 | Kitt Peak | Spacewatch | · | 2.2 km | MPC · JPL |
| 455425 | 2003 KX_{35} | — | May 29, 2003 | Kitt Peak | Spacewatch | · | 1.9 km | MPC · JPL |
| 455426 | 2003 MT_{9} | — | June 30, 2003 | Socorro | LINEAR | T_{j} (2.59) · APO | 680 m | MPC · JPL |
| 455427 | 2003 OP_{26} | — | July 6, 2003 | Kitt Peak | Spacewatch | V | 620 m | MPC · JPL |
| 455428 | 2003 QW_{10} | — | August 23, 2003 | Palomar | NEAT | · | 520 m | MPC · JPL |
| 455429 | 2003 QG_{31} | — | August 19, 2003 | Saint-Sulpice | Saint-Sulpice | · | 1.4 km | MPC · JPL |
| 455430 | 2003 QW_{35} | — | August 22, 2003 | Palomar | NEAT | · | 1.2 km | MPC · JPL |
| 455431 | 2003 QW_{98} | — | August 30, 2003 | Kitt Peak | Spacewatch | EOS | 1.5 km | MPC · JPL |
| 455432 | 2003 RP_{8} | — | September 7, 2003 | Socorro | LINEAR | AMO | 770 m | MPC · JPL |
| 455433 | 2003 RX_{10} | — | September 4, 2003 | Socorro | LINEAR | · | 3.1 km | MPC · JPL |
| 455434 | 2003 RG_{21} | — | September 15, 2003 | Anderson Mesa | LONEOS | MAS | 780 m | MPC · JPL |
| 455435 | 2003 SU_{14} | — | September 17, 2003 | Kitt Peak | Spacewatch | NYS | 1.1 km | MPC · JPL |
| 455436 | 2003 SC_{19} | — | September 16, 2003 | Kitt Peak | Spacewatch | · | 1.7 km | MPC · JPL |
| 455437 | 2003 SJ_{22} | — | September 16, 2003 | Kitt Peak | Spacewatch | · | 2.7 km | MPC · JPL |
| 455438 | 2003 SZ_{43} | — | September 16, 2003 | Anderson Mesa | LONEOS | · | 3.5 km | MPC · JPL |
| 455439 | 2003 SA_{65} | — | September 18, 2003 | Campo Imperatore | CINEOS | · | 3.0 km | MPC · JPL |
| 455440 | 2003 SX_{107} | — | September 20, 2003 | Palomar | NEAT | · | 2.9 km | MPC · JPL |
| 455441 | 2003 SX_{119} | — | September 17, 2003 | Kitt Peak | Spacewatch | · | 990 m | MPC · JPL |
| 455442 | 2003 SY_{136} | — | September 20, 2003 | Kitt Peak | Spacewatch | · | 790 m | MPC · JPL |
| 455443 | 2003 SZ_{160} | — | September 17, 2003 | Kitt Peak | Spacewatch | · | 1.0 km | MPC · JPL |
| 455444 | 2003 SX_{170} | — | September 23, 2003 | Uccle | T. Pauwels | NYS | 990 m | MPC · JPL |
| 455445 | 2003 SG_{181} | — | September 20, 2003 | Socorro | LINEAR | · | 1.1 km | MPC · JPL |
| 455446 | 2003 SA_{193} | — | September 20, 2003 | Palomar | NEAT | · | 1.4 km | MPC · JPL |
| 455447 | 2003 SR_{195} | — | September 20, 2003 | Kitt Peak | Spacewatch | · | 2.0 km | MPC · JPL |
| 455448 | 2003 SG_{231} | — | September 24, 2003 | Palomar | NEAT | NYS | 1.2 km | MPC · JPL |
| 455449 | 2003 SD_{240} | — | September 27, 2003 | Socorro | LINEAR | NYS | 1.3 km | MPC · JPL |
| 455450 | 2003 SH_{245} | — | September 26, 2003 | Socorro | LINEAR | · | 940 m | MPC · JPL |
| 455451 | 2003 SX_{261} | — | September 27, 2003 | Socorro | LINEAR | · | 1.7 km | MPC · JPL |
| 455452 | 2003 SE_{307} | — | September 26, 2003 | Socorro | LINEAR | · | 3.5 km | MPC · JPL |
| 455453 | 2003 SZ_{322} | — | September 16, 2003 | Kitt Peak | Spacewatch | · | 2.2 km | MPC · JPL |
| 455454 | 2003 ST_{334} | — | September 26, 2003 | Apache Point | SDSS | · | 2.4 km | MPC · JPL |
| 455455 | 2003 SY_{355} | — | September 16, 2003 | Kitt Peak | Spacewatch | · | 950 m | MPC · JPL |
| 455456 | 2003 SV_{365} | — | September 26, 2003 | Apache Point | SDSS | NYS | 1.0 km | MPC · JPL |
| 455457 | 2003 SE_{380} | — | September 26, 2003 | Apache Point | SDSS | MAS | 610 m | MPC · JPL |
| 455458 | 2003 SB_{400} | — | September 26, 2003 | Apache Point | SDSS | · | 2.5 km | MPC · JPL |
| 455459 | 2003 SP_{404} | — | September 27, 2003 | Apache Point | SDSS | LIX | 2.6 km | MPC · JPL |
| 455460 | 2003 SL_{423} | — | September 27, 2003 | Kitt Peak | Spacewatch | · | 990 m | MPC · JPL |
| 455461 | 2003 SB_{429} | — | September 19, 2003 | Anderson Mesa | LONEOS | · | 2.2 km | MPC · JPL |
| 455462 | 2003 SZ_{429} | — | September 28, 2003 | Kitt Peak | Spacewatch | · | 2.4 km | MPC · JPL |
| 455463 | 2003 TW_{46} | — | September 16, 2003 | Kitt Peak | Spacewatch | EOS | 1.8 km | MPC · JPL |
| 455464 | 2003 TN_{54} | — | October 5, 2003 | Kitt Peak | Spacewatch | · | 1.1 km | MPC · JPL |
| 455465 | 2003 UW_{6} | — | October 18, 2003 | Palomar | NEAT | · | 4.3 km | MPC · JPL |
| 455466 | 2003 UD_{17} | — | September 21, 2003 | Anderson Mesa | LONEOS | · | 2.9 km | MPC · JPL |
| 455467 | 2003 UW_{21} | — | October 5, 2003 | Socorro | LINEAR | · | 3.0 km | MPC · JPL |
| 455468 | 2003 US_{51} | — | October 18, 2003 | Palomar | NEAT | · | 2.9 km | MPC · JPL |
| 455469 | 2003 UV_{59} | — | October 5, 2003 | Socorro | LINEAR | THB | 2.5 km | MPC · JPL |
| 455470 | 2003 UB_{97} | — | October 19, 2003 | Kitt Peak | Spacewatch | · | 1.2 km | MPC · JPL |
| 455471 | 2003 UZ_{118} | — | October 18, 2003 | Kitt Peak | Spacewatch | · | 1.4 km | MPC · JPL |
| 455472 | 2003 UP_{124} | — | October 20, 2003 | Kitt Peak | Spacewatch | · | 1.5 km | MPC · JPL |
| 455473 | 2003 UK_{126} | — | October 20, 2003 | Palomar | NEAT | EOS | 2.3 km | MPC · JPL |
| 455474 | 2003 UG_{143} | — | October 22, 2003 | Socorro | LINEAR | · | 1.3 km | MPC · JPL |
| 455475 | 2003 UQ_{159} | — | October 20, 2003 | Kitt Peak | Spacewatch | · | 1.0 km | MPC · JPL |
| 455476 | 2003 UK_{178} | — | October 21, 2003 | Palomar | NEAT | NYS | 1.0 km | MPC · JPL |
| 455477 | 2003 US_{191} | — | October 23, 2003 | Anderson Mesa | LONEOS | · | 3.7 km | MPC · JPL |
| 455478 | 2003 UW_{194} | — | October 20, 2003 | Palomar | NEAT | · | 2.5 km | MPC · JPL |
| 455479 | 2003 UL_{210} | — | October 23, 2003 | Kitt Peak | Spacewatch | · | 1.2 km | MPC · JPL |
| 455480 | 2003 UL_{211} | — | October 23, 2003 | Kitt Peak | Spacewatch | · | 2.9 km | MPC · JPL |
| 455481 | 2003 UD_{229} | — | October 23, 2003 | Anderson Mesa | LONEOS | · | 2.4 km | MPC · JPL |
| 455482 | 2003 UB_{232} | — | September 22, 2003 | Kitt Peak | Spacewatch | · | 2.2 km | MPC · JPL |
| 455483 | 2003 UO_{266} | — | October 28, 2003 | Socorro | LINEAR | · | 3.3 km | MPC · JPL |
| 455484 | 2003 UA_{285} | — | September 27, 2003 | Kitt Peak | Spacewatch | · | 2.6 km | MPC · JPL |
| 455485 | 2003 UZ_{295} | — | September 28, 2003 | Kitt Peak | Spacewatch | · | 2.7 km | MPC · JPL |
| 455486 | 2003 UH_{300} | — | October 16, 2003 | Kitt Peak | Spacewatch | · | 850 m | MPC · JPL |
| 455487 | 2003 UQ_{303} | — | October 17, 2003 | Kitt Peak | Spacewatch | · | 2.7 km | MPC · JPL |
| 455488 | 2003 UQ_{324} | — | October 17, 2003 | Kitt Peak | Spacewatch | · | 850 m | MPC · JPL |
| 455489 | 2003 UE_{334} | — | October 18, 2003 | Apache Point | SDSS | · | 1.0 km | MPC · JPL |
| 455490 | 2003 US_{338} | — | October 18, 2003 | Kitt Peak | Spacewatch | · | 1.8 km | MPC · JPL |
| 455491 | 2003 UW_{338} | — | October 18, 2003 | Kitt Peak | Spacewatch | · | 950 m | MPC · JPL |
| 455492 | 2003 UC_{339} | — | September 21, 2003 | Kitt Peak | Spacewatch | THM | 1.7 km | MPC · JPL |
| 455493 | 2003 UK_{351} | — | October 19, 2003 | Apache Point | SDSS | · | 2.3 km | MPC · JPL |
| 455494 | 2003 UJ_{358} | — | September 28, 2003 | Kitt Peak | Spacewatch | · | 2.4 km | MPC · JPL |
| 455495 | 2003 UT_{358} | — | September 28, 2003 | Kitt Peak | Spacewatch | · | 2.4 km | MPC · JPL |
| 455496 | 2003 UD_{366} | — | October 20, 2003 | Kitt Peak | Spacewatch | · | 2.2 km | MPC · JPL |
| 455497 | 2003 UJ_{373} | — | October 22, 2003 | Apache Point | SDSS | · | 3.8 km | MPC · JPL |
| 455498 | 2003 UD_{377} | — | October 22, 2003 | Apache Point | SDSS | NYS | 950 m | MPC · JPL |
| 455499 | 2003 UC_{382} | — | October 22, 2003 | Apache Point | SDSS | · | 2.3 km | MPC · JPL |
| 455500 | 2003 UD_{388} | — | October 22, 2003 | Apache Point | SDSS | · | 1.2 km | MPC · JPL |

== 455501–455600 ==
back to top

| Designation | | | Discovery | | | Properties | | Ref |
| Permanent | Provisional | Named after | Date | Site | Discoverer(s) | Category | Diam. | Ref |
|---|---|---|---|---|---|---|---|---|
| 455501 | 2003 UJ_{405} | — | October 23, 2003 | Apache Point | SDSS | · | 1.6 km | MPC · JPL |
| 455502 | 2003 UZ_{413} | — | October 21, 2003 | Palomar | Palomar | plutino | 650 km | MPC · JPL |
| 455503 | 2003 VN_{4} | — | November 15, 2003 | Needville | J. Dellinger | · | 2.6 km | MPC · JPL |
| 455504 | 2003 VR_{8} | — | November 15, 2003 | Kitt Peak | Spacewatch | · | 2.9 km | MPC · JPL |
| 455505 | 2003 WK_{11} | — | November 18, 2003 | Palomar | NEAT | · | 2.8 km | MPC · JPL |
| 455506 | 2003 WG_{23} | — | November 18, 2003 | Kitt Peak | Spacewatch | · | 1.8 km | MPC · JPL |
| 455507 | 2003 WJ_{28} | — | October 20, 2003 | Kitt Peak | Spacewatch | NYS | 910 m | MPC · JPL |
| 455508 | 2003 WK_{29} | — | November 18, 2003 | Kitt Peak | Spacewatch | · | 2.6 km | MPC · JPL |
| 455509 | 2003 WP_{36} | — | November 19, 2003 | Socorro | LINEAR | · | 1.2 km | MPC · JPL |
| 455510 | 2003 WC_{40} | — | October 25, 2003 | Socorro | LINEAR | · | 1.0 km | MPC · JPL |
| 455511 | 2003 WW_{44} | — | October 3, 2003 | Kitt Peak | Spacewatch | · | 1.1 km | MPC · JPL |
| 455512 | 2003 WY_{83} | — | November 21, 2003 | Kitt Peak | Spacewatch | · | 3.4 km | MPC · JPL |
| 455513 | 2003 WP_{97} | — | November 19, 2003 | Anderson Mesa | LONEOS | · | 860 m | MPC · JPL |
| 455514 | 2003 WF_{98} | — | November 24, 2003 | Socorro | LINEAR | · | 680 m | MPC · JPL |
| 455515 | 2003 WL_{145} | — | November 21, 2003 | Socorro | LINEAR | · | 4.0 km | MPC · JPL |
| 455516 | 2003 WV_{146} | — | November 23, 2003 | Catalina | CSS | H | 470 m | MPC · JPL |
| 455517 | 2003 WF_{173} | — | November 18, 2003 | Palomar | NEAT | · | 1.2 km | MPC · JPL |
| 455518 | 2003 WH_{178} | — | November 20, 2003 | Kitt Peak | M. W. Buie | MAS | 610 m | MPC · JPL |
| 455519 | 2003 WO_{182} | — | October 20, 2003 | Kitt Peak | Spacewatch | THM | 2.0 km | MPC · JPL |
| 455520 | 2003 XK_{17} | — | November 23, 2003 | Kitt Peak | Spacewatch | · | 3.3 km | MPC · JPL |
| 455521 | 2003 XU_{26} | — | December 1, 2003 | Socorro | LINEAR | · | 2.8 km | MPC · JPL |
| 455522 | 2003 XA_{28} | — | November 21, 2003 | Kitt Peak | Spacewatch | · | 2.5 km | MPC · JPL |
| 455523 | 2003 YY_{81} | — | December 18, 2003 | Socorro | LINEAR | · | 1.0 km | MPC · JPL |
| 455524 | 2003 YR_{109} | — | December 22, 2003 | Kitt Peak | Spacewatch | L5 | 10 km | MPC · JPL |
| 455525 | 2003 YN_{112} | — | December 23, 2003 | Socorro | LINEAR | T_{j} (2.98) | 6.7 km | MPC · JPL |
| 455526 | 2003 YT_{135} | — | December 28, 2003 | Kitt Peak | Spacewatch | · | 3.6 km | MPC · JPL |
| 455527 | 2003 YP_{171} | — | December 18, 2003 | Kitt Peak | Spacewatch | · | 1.6 km | MPC · JPL |
| 455528 | 2003 YE_{172} | — | December 18, 2003 | Kitt Peak | Spacewatch | T_{j} (2.98) | 4.9 km | MPC · JPL |
| 455529 | 2004 BV_{6} | — | January 16, 2004 | Anderson Mesa | LONEOS | · | 1.2 km | MPC · JPL |
| 455530 | 2004 BY_{26} | — | January 19, 2004 | Socorro | LINEAR | · | 1.7 km | MPC · JPL |
| 455531 | 2004 BA_{67} | — | January 24, 2004 | Socorro | LINEAR | EUN | 1.6 km | MPC · JPL |
| 455532 | 2004 BF_{79} | — | January 22, 2004 | Socorro | LINEAR | · | 3.3 km | MPC · JPL |
| 455533 | 2004 BW_{142} | — | January 19, 2004 | Kitt Peak | Spacewatch | · | 800 m | MPC · JPL |
| 455534 | 2004 BW_{146} | — | January 22, 2004 | Socorro | LINEAR | · | 1.3 km | MPC · JPL |
| 455535 | 2004 CY_{3} | — | February 10, 2004 | Palomar | NEAT | · | 1.1 km | MPC · JPL |
| 455536 | 2004 CC_{19} | — | February 11, 2004 | Kitt Peak | Spacewatch | · | 3.3 km | MPC · JPL |
| 455537 | 2004 CF_{23} | — | February 12, 2004 | Kitt Peak | Spacewatch | · | 3.3 km | MPC · JPL |
| 455538 | 2004 CQ_{65} | — | February 15, 2004 | Socorro | LINEAR | · | 3.4 km | MPC · JPL |
| 455539 | 2004 CP_{104} | — | February 13, 2004 | Kitt Peak | Spacewatch | · | 820 m | MPC · JPL |
| 455540 | 2004 DC_{54} | — | February 22, 2004 | Kitt Peak | Spacewatch | · | 1.1 km | MPC · JPL |
| 455541 | 2004 EE_{16} | — | March 12, 2004 | Palomar | NEAT | · | 950 m | MPC · JPL |
| 455542 | 2004 FQ_{43} | — | March 19, 2004 | Socorro | LINEAR | · | 1.3 km | MPC · JPL |
| 455543 | 2004 FT_{146} | — | March 16, 2004 | Kitt Peak | Spacewatch | · | 1.3 km | MPC · JPL |
| 455544 | 2004 GD_{18} | — | April 12, 2004 | Catalina | CSS | · | 1.5 km | MPC · JPL |
| 455545 | 2004 GU_{45} | — | April 12, 2004 | Kitt Peak | Spacewatch | · | 1.1 km | MPC · JPL |
| 455546 | 2004 GW_{61} | — | April 13, 2004 | Kitt Peak | Spacewatch | · | 1.1 km | MPC · JPL |
| 455547 | 2004 HR_{43} | — | April 21, 2004 | Socorro | LINEAR | · | 1.1 km | MPC · JPL |
| 455548 | 2004 HW_{58} | — | April 24, 2004 | Kitt Peak | Spacewatch | · | 1.7 km | MPC · JPL |
| 455549 | 2004 HQ_{60} | — | April 24, 2004 | Kitt Peak | Spacewatch | · | 1.4 km | MPC · JPL |
| 455550 | 2004 JO_{2} | — | May 12, 2004 | Anderson Mesa | LONEOS | APO +1km | 1.3 km | MPC · JPL |
| 455551 | 2004 JZ_{9} | — | April 28, 2004 | Kitt Peak | Spacewatch | · | 1.5 km | MPC · JPL |
| 455552 | 2004 KR_{14} | — | May 23, 2004 | Kitt Peak | Spacewatch | · | 1.6 km | MPC · JPL |
| 455553 | 2004 LD_{1} | — | June 9, 2004 | Kitt Peak | Spacewatch | · | 1.9 km | MPC · JPL |
| 455554 | 2004 MQ_{1} | — | June 17, 2004 | Siding Spring | SSS | APO +1km | 880 m | MPC · JPL |
| 455555 | 2004 NX_{19} | — | July 14, 2004 | Socorro | LINEAR | · | 3.2 km | MPC · JPL |
| 455556 | 2004 NW_{21} | — | July 11, 2004 | Socorro | LINEAR | · | 1.1 km | MPC · JPL |
| 455557 | 2004 NW_{22} | — | July 11, 2004 | Socorro | LINEAR | H | 530 m | MPC · JPL |
| 455558 | 2004 NV_{24} | — | July 15, 2004 | Socorro | LINEAR | PHO | 1.3 km | MPC · JPL |
| 455559 | 2004 OU_{11} | — | July 27, 2004 | Socorro | LINEAR | · | 1.8 km | MPC · JPL |
| 455560 | 2004 PG | — | August 5, 2004 | Palomar | NEAT | H | 560 m | MPC · JPL |
| 455561 | 2004 PS_{49} | — | July 25, 2004 | Anderson Mesa | LONEOS | · | 1.6 km | MPC · JPL |
| 455562 | 2004 PM_{70} | — | August 8, 2004 | Campo Imperatore | CINEOS | · | 640 m | MPC · JPL |
| 455563 | 2004 PA_{96} | — | August 10, 2004 | Socorro | LINEAR | PHO | 910 m | MPC · JPL |
| 455564 | 2004 QK_{22} | — | August 25, 2004 | Socorro | LINEAR | PHO | 1.3 km | MPC · JPL |
| 455565 | 2004 QF_{25} | — | August 20, 2004 | Catalina | CSS | (1547) | 1.8 km | MPC · JPL |
| 455566 | 2004 RM_{1} | — | September 4, 2004 | Palomar | NEAT | · | 2.2 km | MPC · JPL |
| 455567 | 2004 RA_{30} | — | September 7, 2004 | Socorro | LINEAR | PHO | 940 m | MPC · JPL |
| 455568 | 2004 RN_{31} | — | September 7, 2004 | Socorro | LINEAR | · | 740 m | MPC · JPL |
| 455569 | 2004 RL_{36} | — | August 11, 2004 | Socorro | LINEAR | · | 780 m | MPC · JPL |
| 455570 | 2004 RE_{39} | — | September 7, 2004 | Socorro | LINEAR | · | 2.1 km | MPC · JPL |
| 455571 | 2004 RF_{46} | — | September 8, 2004 | Socorro | LINEAR | NYS | 780 m | MPC · JPL |
| 455572 | 2004 RC_{54} | — | September 8, 2004 | Socorro | LINEAR | · | 1.0 km | MPC · JPL |
| 455573 | 2004 RA_{62} | — | September 8, 2004 | Socorro | LINEAR | · | 580 m | MPC · JPL |
| 455574 | 2004 RX_{74} | — | September 8, 2004 | Socorro | LINEAR | · | 780 m | MPC · JPL |
| 455575 | 2004 RG_{114} | — | September 7, 2004 | Socorro | LINEAR | · | 2.8 km | MPC · JPL |
| 455576 | 2004 RY_{153} | — | September 10, 2004 | Socorro | LINEAR | · | 810 m | MPC · JPL |
| 455577 | 2004 RF_{179} | — | September 10, 2004 | Socorro | LINEAR | · | 770 m | MPC · JPL |
| 455578 | 2004 RA_{216} | — | September 11, 2004 | Socorro | LINEAR | · | 870 m | MPC · JPL |
| 455579 | 2004 RF_{216} | — | September 11, 2004 | Socorro | LINEAR | · | 2.1 km | MPC · JPL |
| 455580 | 2004 RJ_{242} | — | September 10, 2004 | Kitt Peak | Spacewatch | · | 670 m | MPC · JPL |
| 455581 | 2004 RJ_{252} | — | September 15, 2004 | Socorro | LINEAR | H | 660 m | MPC · JPL |
| 455582 | 2004 RF_{298} | — | September 11, 2004 | Kitt Peak | Spacewatch | · | 1.7 km | MPC · JPL |
| 455583 | 2004 RH_{299} | — | September 11, 2004 | Kitt Peak | Spacewatch | · | 630 m | MPC · JPL |
| 455584 | 2004 RJ_{310} | — | September 13, 2004 | Palomar | NEAT | · | 680 m | MPC · JPL |
| 455585 | 2004 RE_{314} | — | September 8, 2004 | Socorro | LINEAR | · | 640 m | MPC · JPL |
| 455586 | 2004 RG_{315} | — | September 7, 2004 | Kitt Peak | Spacewatch | H | 480 m | MPC · JPL |
| 455587 | 2004 RT_{321} | — | September 10, 2004 | Socorro | LINEAR | · | 890 m | MPC · JPL |
| 455588 | 2004 RU_{331} | — | September 15, 2004 | Socorro | LINEAR | APO | 260 m | MPC · JPL |
| 455589 | 2004 RJ_{335} | — | September 15, 2004 | Kitt Peak | Spacewatch | NYS | 840 m | MPC · JPL |
| 455590 | 2004 RG_{342} | — | September 10, 2004 | Socorro | LINEAR | · | 850 m | MPC · JPL |
| 455591 | 2004 SV_{26} | — | September 23, 2004 | Socorro | LINEAR | AMO | 660 m | MPC · JPL |
| 455592 | 2004 SU_{36} | — | September 17, 2004 | Kitt Peak | Spacewatch | · | 1.6 km | MPC · JPL |
| 455593 | 2004 SD_{52} | — | September 10, 2004 | Socorro | LINEAR | · | 2.5 km | MPC · JPL |
| 455594 | 2004 SV_{55} | — | September 24, 2004 | Socorro | LINEAR | APO +1km | 1.6 km | MPC · JPL |
| 455595 | 2004 TJ_{26} | — | October 4, 2004 | Kitt Peak | Spacewatch | · | 590 m | MPC · JPL |
| 455596 | 2004 TL_{27} | — | October 4, 2004 | Kitt Peak | Spacewatch | · | 710 m | MPC · JPL |
| 455597 | 2004 TB_{33} | — | September 22, 2004 | Kitt Peak | Spacewatch | · | 790 m | MPC · JPL |
| 455598 | 2004 TG_{42} | — | October 4, 2004 | Kitt Peak | Spacewatch | · | 680 m | MPC · JPL |
| 455599 | 2004 TE_{47} | — | October 4, 2004 | Kitt Peak | Spacewatch | · | 950 m | MPC · JPL |
| 455600 | 2004 TM_{49} | — | October 4, 2004 | Kitt Peak | Spacewatch | · | 850 m | MPC · JPL |

== 455601–455700 ==
back to top

| Designation | | | Discovery | | | Properties | | Ref |
| Permanent | Provisional | Named after | Date | Site | Discoverer(s) | Category | Diam. | Ref |
|---|---|---|---|---|---|---|---|---|
| 455601 | 2004 TN_{52} | — | October 4, 2004 | Kitt Peak | Spacewatch | (2076) | 670 m | MPC · JPL |
| 455602 | 2004 TW_{84} | — | October 5, 2004 | Kitt Peak | Spacewatch | KOR | 1.2 km | MPC · JPL |
| 455603 | 2004 TB_{88} | — | October 5, 2004 | Kitt Peak | Spacewatch | KOR | 1.2 km | MPC · JPL |
| 455604 | 2004 TF_{97} | — | October 5, 2004 | Kitt Peak | Spacewatch | KOR | 1.4 km | MPC · JPL |
| 455605 | 2004 TZ_{101} | — | October 6, 2004 | Kitt Peak | Spacewatch | EOS | 1.8 km | MPC · JPL |
| 455606 | 2004 TP_{126} | — | September 8, 2004 | Socorro | LINEAR | · | 940 m | MPC · JPL |
| 455607 | 2004 TA_{148} | — | September 10, 2004 | Kitt Peak | Spacewatch | · | 670 m | MPC · JPL |
| 455608 | 2004 TY_{148} | — | October 6, 2004 | Kitt Peak | Spacewatch | · | 930 m | MPC · JPL |
| 455609 | 2004 TB_{151} | — | October 6, 2004 | Kitt Peak | Spacewatch | · | 1.9 km | MPC · JPL |
| 455610 | 2004 TV_{155} | — | September 10, 2004 | Kitt Peak | Spacewatch | · | 920 m | MPC · JPL |
| 455611 | 2004 TM_{174} | — | October 9, 2004 | Socorro | LINEAR | · | 640 m | MPC · JPL |
| 455612 | 2004 TB_{199} | — | October 7, 2004 | Kitt Peak | Spacewatch | · | 1.7 km | MPC · JPL |
| 455613 | 2004 TS_{207} | — | October 7, 2004 | Kitt Peak | Spacewatch | · | 1.1 km | MPC · JPL |
| 455614 | 2004 TQ_{273} | — | October 9, 2004 | Kitt Peak | Spacewatch | · | 890 m | MPC · JPL |
| 455615 | 2004 TP_{277} | — | October 9, 2004 | Kitt Peak | Spacewatch | · | 740 m | MPC · JPL |
| 455616 | 2004 TS_{277} | — | October 9, 2004 | Kitt Peak | Spacewatch | · | 790 m | MPC · JPL |
| 455617 | 2004 TO_{279} | — | October 10, 2004 | Socorro | LINEAR | · | 800 m | MPC · JPL |
| 455618 | 2004 TB_{326} | — | October 7, 2004 | Kitt Peak | Spacewatch | · | 740 m | MPC · JPL |
| 455619 | 2004 TB_{333} | — | October 9, 2004 | Kitt Peak | Spacewatch | · | 730 m | MPC · JPL |
| 455620 | 2004 TS_{368} | — | October 8, 2004 | Kitt Peak | Spacewatch | · | 750 m | MPC · JPL |
| 455621 | 2004 VT_{1} | — | October 21, 2004 | Socorro | LINEAR | · | 2.3 km | MPC · JPL |
| 455622 | 2004 VS_{5} | — | October 13, 2004 | Kitt Peak | Spacewatch | · | 650 m | MPC · JPL |
| 455623 | 2004 VB_{7} | — | November 3, 2004 | Kitt Peak | Spacewatch | · | 1.7 km | MPC · JPL |
| 455624 | 2004 VE_{32} | — | November 3, 2004 | Kitt Peak | Spacewatch | · | 960 m | MPC · JPL |
| 455625 | 2004 VH_{37} | — | October 10, 2004 | Kitt Peak | Spacewatch | · | 700 m | MPC · JPL |
| 455626 | 2004 VK_{40} | — | November 4, 2004 | Kitt Peak | Spacewatch | · | 1.1 km | MPC · JPL |
| 455627 | 2004 VO_{44} | — | November 4, 2004 | Kitt Peak | Spacewatch | NYS | 940 m | MPC · JPL |
| 455628 | 2004 VA_{45} | — | November 4, 2004 | Kitt Peak | Spacewatch | · | 2.4 km | MPC · JPL |
| 455629 | 2004 VA_{54} | — | November 3, 2004 | Catalina | CSS | · | 2.1 km | MPC · JPL |
| 455630 | 2004 VO_{63} | — | November 4, 2004 | Catalina | CSS | · | 840 m | MPC · JPL |
| 455631 | 2004 VG_{88} | — | October 11, 2004 | Kitt Peak | Spacewatch | · | 1.4 km | MPC · JPL |
| 455632 | 2004 WN_{4} | — | November 9, 2004 | Catalina | CSS | · | 760 m | MPC · JPL |
| 455633 | 2004 WR_{12} | — | November 17, 2004 | Siding Spring | SSS | H | 450 m | MPC · JPL |
| 455634 | 2004 XF_{2} | — | December 1, 2004 | Palomar | NEAT | · | 3.3 km | MPC · JPL |
| 455635 | 2004 XL_{6} | — | December 13, 1996 | Kitt Peak | Spacewatch | H | 650 m | MPC · JPL |
| 455636 | 2004 XD_{11} | — | December 3, 2004 | Kitt Peak | Spacewatch | · | 3.3 km | MPC · JPL |
| 455637 | 2004 XC_{15} | — | December 8, 2004 | Socorro | LINEAR | · | 930 m | MPC · JPL |
| 455638 | 2004 XO_{26} | — | December 10, 2004 | Kitt Peak | Spacewatch | · | 1.8 km | MPC · JPL |
| 455639 | 2004 XG_{28} | — | November 11, 2004 | Catalina | CSS | H | 670 m | MPC · JPL |
| 455640 | 2004 XO_{70} | — | December 11, 2004 | Anderson Mesa | LONEOS | · | 3.2 km | MPC · JPL |
| 455641 | 2004 XN_{78} | — | December 10, 2004 | Socorro | LINEAR | · | 950 m | MPC · JPL |
| 455642 | 2004 XJ_{91} | — | December 11, 2004 | Kitt Peak | Spacewatch | · | 3.4 km | MPC · JPL |
| 455643 | 2004 XV_{97} | — | December 11, 2004 | Kitt Peak | Spacewatch | · | 2.5 km | MPC · JPL |
| 455644 | 2004 XH_{126} | — | December 12, 2004 | Kitt Peak | Spacewatch | · | 900 m | MPC · JPL |
| 455645 | 2004 XV_{146} | — | November 10, 2004 | Kitt Peak | Spacewatch | H | 570 m | MPC · JPL |
| 455646 | 2004 XL_{155} | — | December 12, 2004 | Kitt Peak | Spacewatch | TIR | 3.2 km | MPC · JPL |
| 455647 | 2004 XB_{165} | — | December 2, 2004 | Kitt Peak | Spacewatch | · | 3.1 km | MPC · JPL |
| 455648 | 2004 YX_{15} | — | December 18, 2004 | Mount Lemmon | Mount Lemmon Survey | · | 990 m | MPC · JPL |
| 455649 | 2005 AP | — | January 5, 2005 | Pla D'Arguines | D'Arguines, Pla | · | 850 m | MPC · JPL |
| 455650 | 2005 AC_{3} | — | January 6, 2005 | Catalina | CSS | H | 690 m | MPC · JPL |
| 455651 | 2005 AA_{10} | — | January 6, 2005 | Catalina | CSS | H | 650 m | MPC · JPL |
| 455652 | 2005 AV_{19} | — | December 20, 2004 | Mount Lemmon | Mount Lemmon Survey | PHO | 1.0 km | MPC · JPL |
| 455653 | 2005 AE_{48} | — | December 20, 2004 | Mount Lemmon | Mount Lemmon Survey | · | 1.1 km | MPC · JPL |
| 455654 | 2005 AS_{53} | — | January 13, 2005 | Kitt Peak | Spacewatch | LIX | 4.8 km | MPC · JPL |
| 455655 | 2005 AO_{60} | — | January 15, 2005 | Kitt Peak | Spacewatch | PHO | 970 m | MPC · JPL |
| 455656 | 2005 AB_{67} | — | December 20, 2004 | Mount Lemmon | Mount Lemmon Survey | · | 2.3 km | MPC · JPL |
| 455657 | 2005 AJ_{81} | — | January 6, 2005 | Catalina | CSS | · | 4.1 km | MPC · JPL |
| 455658 | 2005 AS_{82} | — | January 8, 2005 | Campo Imperatore | CINEOS | · | 1.0 km | MPC · JPL |
| 455659 | 2005 BO_{1} | — | January 17, 2005 | Kitt Peak | Spacewatch | ATE | 170 m | MPC · JPL |
| 455660 | 2005 BW_{10} | — | January 16, 2005 | Socorro | LINEAR | · | 2.0 km | MPC · JPL |
| 455661 | 2005 BS_{22} | — | December 18, 2004 | Mount Lemmon | Mount Lemmon Survey | · | 1.1 km | MPC · JPL |
| 455662 | 2005 BL_{23} | — | January 16, 2005 | Kitt Peak | Spacewatch | · | 1.2 km | MPC · JPL |
| 455663 | 2005 BY_{38} | — | December 18, 2004 | Mount Lemmon | Mount Lemmon Survey | · | 2.3 km | MPC · JPL |
| 455664 | 2005 CU_{5} | — | February 1, 2005 | Palomar | NEAT | H | 710 m | MPC · JPL |
| 455665 | 2005 CK_{9} | — | February 1, 2005 | Catalina | CSS | · | 4.5 km | MPC · JPL |
| 455666 | 2005 CN_{17} | — | February 2, 2005 | Socorro | LINEAR | NYS | 910 m | MPC · JPL |
| 455667 | 2005 CG_{32} | — | February 1, 2005 | Kitt Peak | Spacewatch | · | 3.5 km | MPC · JPL |
| 455668 | 2005 CQ_{59} | — | February 2, 2005 | Socorro | LINEAR | · | 4.6 km | MPC · JPL |
| 455669 | 2005 CB_{61} | — | February 3, 2005 | Calvin-Rehoboth | Calvin College | · | 1.8 km | MPC · JPL |
| 455670 | 2005 CD_{67} | — | February 9, 2005 | Socorro | LINEAR | T_{j} (2.89) | 4.5 km | MPC · JPL |
| 455671 | 2005 CR_{72} | — | February 1, 2005 | Kitt Peak | Spacewatch | TIR | 2.1 km | MPC · JPL |
| 455672 | 2005 DE | — | February 18, 2005 | La Silla | A. Boattini, H. Scholl | T_{j} (2.88) | 1.8 km | MPC · JPL |
| 455673 | 2005 DG_{1} | — | February 17, 2005 | La Silla | A. Boattini, H. Scholl | · | 840 m | MPC · JPL |
| 455674 | 2005 ER_{2} | — | March 3, 2005 | Socorro | LINEAR | T_{j} (2.94) | 3.5 km | MPC · JPL |
| 455675 | 2005 EV_{2} | — | March 1, 2005 | Kitt Peak | Spacewatch | NYS | 1.1 km | MPC · JPL |
| 455676 | 2005 EY_{8} | — | March 2, 2005 | Kitt Peak | Spacewatch | · | 3.7 km | MPC · JPL |
| 455677 | 2005 ES_{11} | — | February 3, 2005 | Socorro | LINEAR | · | 1.3 km | MPC · JPL |
| 455678 | 2005 EY_{16} | — | March 3, 2005 | Kitt Peak | Spacewatch | · | 1.0 km | MPC · JPL |
| 455679 | 2005 EC_{26} | — | March 3, 2005 | Catalina | CSS | MAS | 670 m | MPC · JPL |
| 455680 | 2005 EJ_{26} | — | March 3, 2005 | Catalina | CSS | T_{j} (2.98) | 3.3 km | MPC · JPL |
| 455681 | 2005 EF_{38} | — | March 1, 2005 | Kitt Peak | Spacewatch | H | 560 m | MPC · JPL |
| 455682 | 2005 EP_{46} | — | March 3, 2005 | Catalina | CSS | · | 3.5 km | MPC · JPL |
| 455683 | 2005 EJ_{64} | — | March 4, 2005 | Kitt Peak | Spacewatch | · | 1.4 km | MPC · JPL |
| 455684 | 2005 EY_{67} | — | March 4, 2005 | Kvistaberg | Uppsala-DLR Asteroid Survey | · | 4.9 km | MPC · JPL |
| 455685 | 2005 ED_{80} | — | March 3, 2005 | Catalina | CSS | · | 4.2 km | MPC · JPL |
| 455686 | 2005 EZ_{88} | — | March 8, 2005 | Kitt Peak | Spacewatch | · | 3.9 km | MPC · JPL |
| 455687 | 2005 EK_{94} | — | March 9, 2005 | Catalina | CSS | AMO · PHA | 490 m | MPC · JPL |
| 455688 | 2005 EP_{100} | — | March 3, 2005 | Catalina | CSS | · | 5.1 km | MPC · JPL |
| 455689 | 2005 EL_{102} | — | March 3, 2005 | Kitt Peak | Spacewatch | · | 3.0 km | MPC · JPL |
| 455690 | 2005 EH_{113} | — | March 4, 2005 | Mount Lemmon | Mount Lemmon Survey | · | 950 m | MPC · JPL |
| 455691 | 2005 EP_{123} | — | March 8, 2005 | Kitt Peak | Spacewatch | · | 1.0 km | MPC · JPL |
| 455692 | 2005 EA_{125} | — | March 8, 2005 | Mount Lemmon | Mount Lemmon Survey | · | 1.2 km | MPC · JPL |
| 455693 | 2005 EN_{150} | — | March 10, 2005 | Kitt Peak | Spacewatch | · | 2.1 km | MPC · JPL |
| 455694 | 2005 EN_{169} | — | January 16, 2005 | Catalina | CSS | PHO | 1.4 km | MPC · JPL |
| 455695 | 2005 EP_{173} | — | March 8, 2005 | Kitt Peak | Spacewatch | · | 1.3 km | MPC · JPL |
| 455696 | 2005 EB_{181} | — | March 9, 2005 | Mount Lemmon | Mount Lemmon Survey | · | 3.1 km | MPC · JPL |
| 455697 | 2005 EB_{188} | — | March 10, 2005 | Mount Lemmon | Mount Lemmon Survey | · | 1 km | MPC · JPL |
| 455698 | 2005 EY_{191} | — | March 11, 2005 | Mount Lemmon | Mount Lemmon Survey | · | 2.1 km | MPC · JPL |
| 455699 | 2005 ED_{192} | — | March 11, 2005 | Mount Lemmon | Mount Lemmon Survey | · | 2.7 km | MPC · JPL |
| 455700 | 2005 ES_{197} | — | March 3, 2005 | Catalina | CSS | NYS | 1.0 km | MPC · JPL |

== 455701–455800 ==
back to top

| Designation | | | Discovery | | | Properties | | Ref |
| Permanent | Provisional | Named after | Date | Site | Discoverer(s) | Category | Diam. | Ref |
|---|---|---|---|---|---|---|---|---|
| 455701 | 2005 EZ_{208} | — | March 4, 2005 | Kitt Peak | Spacewatch | · | 1.2 km | MPC · JPL |
| 455702 | 2005 EL_{211} | — | March 4, 2005 | Socorro | LINEAR | PHO | 1.0 km | MPC · JPL |
| 455703 | 2005 EL_{213} | — | March 4, 2005 | Mount Lemmon | Mount Lemmon Survey | · | 4.0 km | MPC · JPL |
| 455704 | 2005 EO_{241} | — | March 11, 2005 | Catalina | CSS | · | 1.2 km | MPC · JPL |
| 455705 | 2005 ER_{243} | — | March 11, 2005 | Anderson Mesa | LONEOS | · | 4.1 km | MPC · JPL |
| 455706 | 2005 EC_{246} | — | March 12, 2005 | Kitt Peak | Spacewatch | · | 2.9 km | MPC · JPL |
| 455707 | 2005 EC_{267} | — | March 13, 2005 | Kitt Peak | Spacewatch | · | 3.0 km | MPC · JPL |
| 455708 | 2005 EK_{268} | — | March 14, 2005 | Mount Lemmon | Mount Lemmon Survey | · | 4.3 km | MPC · JPL |
| 455709 | 2005 EP_{280} | — | March 10, 2005 | Catalina | CSS | · | 3.2 km | MPC · JPL |
| 455710 | 2005 ET_{306} | — | February 9, 2005 | Mount Lemmon | Mount Lemmon Survey | · | 1.3 km | MPC · JPL |
| 455711 | 2005 EV_{316} | — | March 11, 2005 | Kitt Peak | Spacewatch | · | 2.9 km | MPC · JPL |
| 455712 | 2005 EH_{317} | — | March 12, 2005 | Kitt Peak | M. W. Buie | · | 2.7 km | MPC · JPL |
| 455713 | 2005 FU_{3} | — | March 16, 2005 | Catalina | CSS | · | 3.0 km | MPC · JPL |
| 455714 | 2005 GL_{18} | — | April 2, 2005 | Kitt Peak | Spacewatch | · | 1.4 km | MPC · JPL |
| 455715 | 2005 GX_{21} | — | April 4, 2005 | Catalina | CSS | · | 3.8 km | MPC · JPL |
| 455716 | 2005 GC_{25} | — | April 2, 2005 | Mount Lemmon | Mount Lemmon Survey | · | 1.1 km | MPC · JPL |
| 455717 | 2005 GA_{29} | — | April 4, 2005 | Kitt Peak | Spacewatch | · | 1.4 km | MPC · JPL |
| 455718 | 2005 GF_{42} | — | April 5, 2005 | Mount Lemmon | Mount Lemmon Survey | NYS | 1.1 km | MPC · JPL |
| 455719 | 2005 GV_{62} | — | March 10, 2005 | Mount Lemmon | Mount Lemmon Survey | · | 2.8 km | MPC · JPL |
| 455720 | 2005 GE_{65} | — | March 10, 2005 | Catalina | CSS | · | 2.6 km | MPC · JPL |
| 455721 | 2005 GO_{68} | — | April 2, 2005 | Catalina | CSS | · | 2.4 km | MPC · JPL |
| 455722 | 2005 GM_{90} | — | March 17, 2005 | Mount Lemmon | Mount Lemmon Survey | · | 2.7 km | MPC · JPL |
| 455723 | 2005 GU_{90} | — | April 6, 2005 | Kitt Peak | Spacewatch | · | 1.1 km | MPC · JPL |
| 455724 | 2005 GA_{117} | — | April 11, 2005 | Kitt Peak | Spacewatch | · | 890 m | MPC · JPL |
| 455725 | 2005 GA_{126} | — | March 4, 2005 | Kitt Peak | Spacewatch | NYS | 1.1 km | MPC · JPL |
| 455726 | 2005 GR_{130} | — | April 8, 2005 | Socorro | LINEAR | · | 5.0 km | MPC · JPL |
| 455727 | 2005 GK_{131} | — | April 10, 2005 | Kitt Peak | Spacewatch | NYS | 1.1 km | MPC · JPL |
| 455728 | 2005 GU_{132} | — | April 10, 2005 | Kitt Peak | Spacewatch | MAS | 630 m | MPC · JPL |
| 455729 | 2005 GZ_{134} | — | April 10, 2005 | Mount Lemmon | Mount Lemmon Survey | · | 2.1 km | MPC · JPL |
| 455730 | 2005 GF_{141} | — | April 12, 2005 | Socorro | LINEAR | T_{j} (2.94) | 3.8 km | MPC · JPL |
| 455731 | 2005 GF_{149} | — | April 11, 2005 | Kitt Peak | Spacewatch | · | 3.1 km | MPC · JPL |
| 455732 | 2005 GN_{160} | — | April 12, 2005 | Mount Lemmon | Mount Lemmon Survey | · | 2.7 km | MPC · JPL |
| 455733 | 2005 GE_{180} | — | April 7, 2005 | Catalina | CSS | · | 4.8 km | MPC · JPL |
| 455734 | 2005 GJ_{180} | — | April 12, 2005 | Anderson Mesa | LONEOS | · | 3.9 km | MPC · JPL |
| 455735 | 2005 GR_{222} | — | April 10, 2005 | Kitt Peak | Spacewatch | MAS | 660 m | MPC · JPL |
| 455736 | 2005 HC_{3} | — | April 18, 2005 | Socorro | LINEAR | AMO +1km | 950 m | MPC · JPL |
| 455737 | 2005 HR_{7} | — | April 30, 2005 | Kitt Peak | Spacewatch | · | 3.3 km | MPC · JPL |
| 455738 | 2005 JD | — | May 1, 2005 | Campo Imperatore | CINEOS | · | 1.3 km | MPC · JPL |
| 455739 Isabelita | 2005 JG_{2} | Isabelita | May 2, 2005 | La Cañada | Lacruz, J. | · | 1.1 km | MPC · JPL |
| 455740 | 2005 JA_{14} | — | April 15, 2005 | Catalina | CSS | · | 1.5 km | MPC · JPL |
| 455741 | 2005 JL_{31} | — | May 4, 2005 | Anderson Mesa | LONEOS | · | 3.7 km | MPC · JPL |
| 455742 | 2005 JJ_{34} | — | May 4, 2005 | Kitt Peak | Spacewatch | · | 1.1 km | MPC · JPL |
| 455743 | 2005 JV_{45} | — | May 3, 2005 | Kitt Peak | Deep Lens Survey | · | 3.2 km | MPC · JPL |
| 455744 | 2005 JW_{48} | — | May 3, 2005 | Kitt Peak | Spacewatch | PHO | 3.1 km | MPC · JPL |
| 455745 | 2005 JU_{55} | — | May 4, 2005 | Kitt Peak | Spacewatch | MAR | 1.1 km | MPC · JPL |
| 455746 | 2005 JM_{85} | — | May 8, 2005 | Mount Lemmon | Mount Lemmon Survey | · | 1.2 km | MPC · JPL |
| 455747 | 2005 JL_{112} | — | May 9, 2005 | Catalina | CSS | · | 1.4 km | MPC · JPL |
| 455748 | 2005 JO_{112} | — | May 9, 2005 | Anderson Mesa | LONEOS | · | 2.3 km | MPC · JPL |
| 455749 | 2005 JL_{117} | — | May 10, 2005 | Kitt Peak | Spacewatch | · | 1.0 km | MPC · JPL |
| 455750 | 2005 JA_{131} | — | April 16, 2005 | Kitt Peak | Spacewatch | EUN | 1.0 km | MPC · JPL |
| 455751 | 2005 JE_{152} | — | May 4, 2005 | Mount Lemmon | Mount Lemmon Survey | MAS | 770 m | MPC · JPL |
| 455752 | 2005 JV_{185} | — | May 1, 2005 | Palomar | NEAT | · | 1.3 km | MPC · JPL |
| 455753 | 2005 KX_{8} | — | May 2, 2005 | Kitt Peak | Spacewatch | · | 1.9 km | MPC · JPL |
| 455754 | 2005 LV_{39} | — | May 4, 2005 | Kitt Peak | Spacewatch | · | 1.2 km | MPC · JPL |
| 455755 | 2005 LS_{53} | — | June 2, 2005 | Mount Lemmon | Mount Lemmon Survey | JUN | 1.0 km | MPC · JPL |
| 455756 | 2005 MA_{1} | — | June 17, 2005 | Mount Lemmon | Mount Lemmon Survey | ADE | 2.3 km | MPC · JPL |
| 455757 | 2005 ME_{1} | — | June 17, 2005 | Mount Lemmon | Mount Lemmon Survey | EUN | 1.2 km | MPC · JPL |
| 455758 | 2005 MP_{14} | — | June 28, 2005 | Palomar | NEAT | · | 1.7 km | MPC · JPL |
| 455759 | 2005 MR_{26} | — | June 14, 2005 | Mount Lemmon | Mount Lemmon Survey | · | 1.3 km | MPC · JPL |
| 455760 | 2005 MF_{31} | — | June 30, 2005 | Kitt Peak | Spacewatch | · | 1.6 km | MPC · JPL |
| 455761 | 2005 MO_{36} | — | June 30, 2005 | Kitt Peak | Spacewatch | DOR | 2.3 km | MPC · JPL |
| 455762 | 2005 NW_{1} | — | July 1, 2005 | Kitt Peak | Spacewatch | EUN | 1.1 km | MPC · JPL |
| 455763 | 2005 NH_{2} | — | July 2, 2005 | Kitt Peak | Spacewatch | · | 2.2 km | MPC · JPL |
| 455764 | 2005 NW_{11} | — | July 4, 2005 | Kitt Peak | Spacewatch | · | 900 m | MPC · JPL |
| 455765 | 2005 ND_{12} | — | July 4, 2005 | Mount Lemmon | Mount Lemmon Survey | · | 1.4 km | MPC · JPL |
| 455766 | 2005 NU_{19} | — | July 5, 2005 | Mount Lemmon | Mount Lemmon Survey | · | 500 m | MPC · JPL |
| 455767 | 2005 NX_{25} | — | July 4, 2005 | Kitt Peak | Spacewatch | · | 2.4 km | MPC · JPL |
| 455768 | 2005 NF_{41} | — | July 4, 2005 | Mount Lemmon | Mount Lemmon Survey | · | 1.3 km | MPC · JPL |
| 455769 | 2005 NR_{43} | — | June 27, 2005 | Kitt Peak | Spacewatch | ADE | 1.8 km | MPC · JPL |
| 455770 | 2005 NC_{50} | — | June 18, 2005 | Mount Lemmon | Mount Lemmon Survey | · | 1.6 km | MPC · JPL |
| 455771 | 2005 NA_{68} | — | July 3, 2005 | Palomar | NEAT | · | 1.1 km | MPC · JPL |
| 455772 | 2005 NF_{97} | — | July 8, 2005 | Kitt Peak | Spacewatch | · | 1.5 km | MPC · JPL |
| 455773 | 2005 NQ_{122} | — | July 3, 2005 | Catalina | CSS | · | 2.9 km | MPC · JPL |
| 455774 | 2005 OV_{4} | — | July 28, 2005 | Palomar | NEAT | · | 1.7 km | MPC · JPL |
| 455775 | 2005 OX_{6} | — | July 2, 2005 | Catalina | CSS | · | 2.2 km | MPC · JPL |
| 455776 | 2005 OM_{15} | — | June 27, 2005 | Kitt Peak | Spacewatch | JUN | 1.0 km | MPC · JPL |
| 455777 | 2005 OS_{27} | — | July 27, 2005 | Palomar | NEAT | · | 1.4 km | MPC · JPL |
| 455778 | 2005 PR_{14} | — | August 4, 2005 | Palomar | NEAT | BRG | 1.4 km | MPC · JPL |
| 455779 | 2005 QX_{19} | — | August 26, 2005 | Campo Imperatore | CINEOS | MIS | 2.5 km | MPC · JPL |
| 455780 | 2005 QX_{21} | — | August 27, 2005 | Kitt Peak | Spacewatch | · | 1.5 km | MPC · JPL |
| 455781 | 2005 QG_{50} | — | August 26, 2005 | Palomar | NEAT | · | 2.1 km | MPC · JPL |
| 455782 | 2005 QX_{54} | — | August 28, 2005 | Kitt Peak | Spacewatch | · | 1.5 km | MPC · JPL |
| 455783 | 2005 QE_{81} | — | August 29, 2005 | Kitt Peak | Spacewatch | · | 1.8 km | MPC · JPL |
| 455784 | 2005 QZ_{113} | — | August 27, 2005 | Palomar | NEAT | · | 1.0 km | MPC · JPL |
| 455785 | 2005 QW_{115} | — | August 28, 2005 | Kitt Peak | Spacewatch | · | 1.3 km | MPC · JPL |
| 455786 | 2005 QQ_{117} | — | August 28, 2005 | Kitt Peak | Spacewatch | · | 1.4 km | MPC · JPL |
| 455787 | 2005 QX_{121} | — | August 28, 2005 | Kitt Peak | Spacewatch | · | 1.9 km | MPC · JPL |
| 455788 | 2005 QC_{137} | — | August 28, 2005 | Kitt Peak | Spacewatch | · | 1.3 km | MPC · JPL |
| 455789 | 2005 QN_{187} | — | August 31, 2005 | Kitt Peak | Spacewatch | · | 2.0 km | MPC · JPL |
| 455790 | 2005 QJ_{188} | — | August 31, 2005 | Kitt Peak | Spacewatch | · | 1.3 km | MPC · JPL |
| 455791 | 2005 RU_{25} | — | June 11, 2005 | Catalina | CSS | · | 2.7 km | MPC · JPL |
| 455792 | 2005 RO_{40} | — | September 10, 2005 | Anderson Mesa | LONEOS | · | 1.7 km | MPC · JPL |
| 455793 | 2005 RP_{40} | — | July 8, 2005 | Anderson Mesa | LONEOS | · | 2.0 km | MPC · JPL |
| 455794 | 2005 RN_{51} | — | September 12, 2005 | Kitt Peak | Spacewatch | · | 1.7 km | MPC · JPL |
| 455795 | 2005 SF | — | September 21, 2005 | Siding Spring | SSS | APO +1km | 1.2 km | MPC · JPL |
| 455796 | 2005 SE_{4} | — | September 24, 2005 | Anderson Mesa | LONEOS | · | 1.8 km | MPC · JPL |
| 455797 | 2005 SY_{4} | — | August 31, 2005 | Kitt Peak | Spacewatch | · | 1.2 km | MPC · JPL |
| 455798 | 2005 SB_{11} | — | September 23, 2005 | Catalina | CSS | EUN | 1.2 km | MPC · JPL |
| 455799 | 2005 SW_{11} | — | September 23, 2005 | Kitt Peak | Spacewatch | · | 1.8 km | MPC · JPL |
| 455800 | 2005 SJ_{12} | — | September 23, 2005 | Catalina | CSS | ADE | 2.0 km | MPC · JPL |

== 455801–455900 ==
back to top

| Designation | | | Discovery | | | Properties | | Ref |
| Permanent | Provisional | Named after | Date | Site | Discoverer(s) | Category | Diam. | Ref |
|---|---|---|---|---|---|---|---|---|
| 455801 | 2005 SV_{47} | — | September 24, 2005 | Kitt Peak | Spacewatch | · | 1.4 km | MPC · JPL |
| 455802 | 2005 SE_{62} | — | September 26, 2005 | Kitt Peak | Spacewatch | · | 1.9 km | MPC · JPL |
| 455803 | 2005 SV_{66} | — | September 27, 2005 | Kitt Peak | Spacewatch | HOF | 2.3 km | MPC · JPL |
| 455804 | 2005 SL_{78} | — | September 24, 2005 | Kitt Peak | Spacewatch | · | 1.6 km | MPC · JPL |
| 455805 | 2005 SP_{110} | — | September 26, 2005 | Kitt Peak | Spacewatch | · | 1.7 km | MPC · JPL |
| 455806 | 2005 SF_{118} | — | September 28, 2005 | Palomar | NEAT | · | 1.9 km | MPC · JPL |
| 455807 | 2005 SF_{133} | — | September 29, 2005 | Kitt Peak | Spacewatch | · | 1.5 km | MPC · JPL |
| 455808 | 2005 SY_{146} | — | September 25, 2005 | Kitt Peak | Spacewatch | · | 1.7 km | MPC · JPL |
| 455809 | 2005 SQ_{148} | — | September 25, 2005 | Kitt Peak | Spacewatch | · | 2.0 km | MPC · JPL |
| 455810 | 2005 SW_{148} | — | September 25, 2005 | Kitt Peak | Spacewatch | · | 1.7 km | MPC · JPL |
| 455811 | 2005 SH_{171} | — | September 29, 2005 | Kitt Peak | Spacewatch | · | 1.9 km | MPC · JPL |
| 455812 | 2005 SJ_{178} | — | August 31, 2005 | Kitt Peak | Spacewatch | · | 1.7 km | MPC · JPL |
| 455813 | 2005 SK_{184} | — | September 24, 2005 | Kitt Peak | Spacewatch | · | 1.5 km | MPC · JPL |
| 455814 | 2005 SK_{188} | — | September 29, 2005 | Mount Lemmon | Mount Lemmon Survey | · | 1.7 km | MPC · JPL |
| 455815 | 2005 SO_{198} | — | September 30, 2005 | Mount Lemmon | Mount Lemmon Survey | MIS | 2.4 km | MPC · JPL |
| 455816 | 2005 SW_{212} | — | September 30, 2005 | Mount Lemmon | Mount Lemmon Survey | · | 1.6 km | MPC · JPL |
| 455817 | 2005 SV_{214} | — | September 30, 2005 | Anderson Mesa | LONEOS | · | 1.5 km | MPC · JPL |
| 455818 | 2005 SS_{223} | — | September 29, 2005 | Mount Lemmon | Mount Lemmon Survey | · | 1.7 km | MPC · JPL |
| 455819 | 2005 SL_{232} | — | September 30, 2005 | Mount Lemmon | Mount Lemmon Survey | · | 1.7 km | MPC · JPL |
| 455820 | 2005 SK_{233} | — | September 30, 2005 | Mount Lemmon | Mount Lemmon Survey | · | 1.7 km | MPC · JPL |
| 455821 | 2005 SU_{240} | — | September 25, 2005 | Kitt Peak | Spacewatch | WIT | 940 m | MPC · JPL |
| 455822 | 2005 SV_{240} | — | September 30, 2005 | Kitt Peak | Spacewatch | · | 1.5 km | MPC · JPL |
| 455823 | 2005 SA_{291} | — | September 25, 2005 | Kitt Peak | Spacewatch | · | 1.6 km | MPC · JPL |
| 455824 | 2005 SD_{293} | — | September 26, 2005 | Catalina | CSS | · | 2.1 km | MPC · JPL |
| 455825 | 2005 TL_{3} | — | September 16, 2005 | Anderson Mesa | LONEOS | · | 2.3 km | MPC · JPL |
| 455826 | 2005 TQ_{14} | — | October 3, 2005 | Catalina | CSS | · | 1.6 km | MPC · JPL |
| 455827 | 2005 TX_{15} | — | October 1, 2005 | Kitt Peak | Spacewatch | AGN | 920 m | MPC · JPL |
| 455828 | 2005 TQ_{23} | — | September 1, 2005 | Kitt Peak | Spacewatch | · | 1.6 km | MPC · JPL |
| 455829 | 2005 TQ_{25} | — | October 1, 2005 | Mount Lemmon | Mount Lemmon Survey | · | 540 m | MPC · JPL |
| 455830 | 2005 TX_{32} | — | October 1, 2005 | Kitt Peak | Spacewatch | · | 1.5 km | MPC · JPL |
| 455831 | 2005 TB_{45} | — | September 30, 2005 | Mount Lemmon | Mount Lemmon Survey | · | 1.5 km | MPC · JPL |
| 455832 | 2005 TB_{62} | — | October 4, 2005 | Mount Lemmon | Mount Lemmon Survey | · | 570 m | MPC · JPL |
| 455833 | 2005 TS_{77} | — | September 8, 2005 | Socorro | LINEAR | · | 2.4 km | MPC · JPL |
| 455834 | 2005 TC_{84} | — | September 24, 2005 | Kitt Peak | Spacewatch | · | 1.8 km | MPC · JPL |
| 455835 | 2005 TO_{84} | — | October 3, 2005 | Kitt Peak | Spacewatch | · | 1.7 km | MPC · JPL |
| 455836 | 2005 TU_{94} | — | September 25, 2005 | Kitt Peak | Spacewatch | · | 1.7 km | MPC · JPL |
| 455837 | 2005 TW_{96} | — | September 29, 2005 | Mount Lemmon | Mount Lemmon Survey | · | 1.7 km | MPC · JPL |
| 455838 | 2005 TU_{97} | — | October 6, 2005 | Mount Lemmon | Mount Lemmon Survey | · | 1.7 km | MPC · JPL |
| 455839 | 2005 TX_{97} | — | October 6, 2005 | Mount Lemmon | Mount Lemmon Survey | · | 1.7 km | MPC · JPL |
| 455840 | 2005 TZ_{97} | — | October 6, 2005 | Mount Lemmon | Mount Lemmon Survey | AGN | 850 m | MPC · JPL |
| 455841 | 2005 TM_{110} | — | October 1, 2005 | Catalina | CSS | · | 1.7 km | MPC · JPL |
| 455842 | 2005 TQ_{111} | — | September 27, 2005 | Kitt Peak | Spacewatch | · | 1.6 km | MPC · JPL |
| 455843 | 2005 TU_{120} | — | October 7, 2005 | Kitt Peak | Spacewatch | · | 1.7 km | MPC · JPL |
| 455844 | 2005 TE_{130} | — | September 29, 2005 | Mount Lemmon | Mount Lemmon Survey | · | 1.5 km | MPC · JPL |
| 455845 | 2005 TB_{135} | — | October 1, 2005 | Mount Lemmon | Mount Lemmon Survey | · | 2.0 km | MPC · JPL |
| 455846 | 2005 TZ_{149} | — | September 29, 2005 | Kitt Peak | Spacewatch | · | 1.5 km | MPC · JPL |
| 455847 | 2005 TS_{158} | — | September 26, 2005 | Kitt Peak | Spacewatch | · | 490 m | MPC · JPL |
| 455848 | 2005 TN_{168} | — | October 2, 2005 | Mount Lemmon | Mount Lemmon Survey | · | 2.0 km | MPC · JPL |
| 455849 | 2005 TN_{179} | — | October 5, 2005 | Mount Lemmon | Mount Lemmon Survey | MAR | 990 m | MPC · JPL |
| 455850 | 2005 TJ_{190} | — | October 1, 2005 | Kitt Peak | Spacewatch | · | 1.5 km | MPC · JPL |
| 455851 | 2005 UF_{6} | — | October 25, 2005 | Catalina | CSS | H | 580 m | MPC · JPL |
| 455852 | 2005 UA_{13} | — | October 9, 2005 | Kitt Peak | Spacewatch | · | 1.3 km | MPC · JPL |
| 455853 | 2005 UD_{13} | — | October 9, 2005 | Kitt Peak | Spacewatch | WIT | 800 m | MPC · JPL |
| 455854 | 2005 UU_{15} | — | October 22, 2005 | Kitt Peak | Spacewatch | · | 1.9 km | MPC · JPL |
| 455855 | 2005 UD_{22} | — | October 23, 2005 | Kitt Peak | Spacewatch | DOR | 2.2 km | MPC · JPL |
| 455856 | 2005 UQ_{23} | — | October 23, 2005 | Kitt Peak | Spacewatch | · | 1.4 km | MPC · JPL |
| 455857 | 2005 UX_{27} | — | October 23, 2005 | Kitt Peak | Spacewatch | · | 2.0 km | MPC · JPL |
| 455858 | 2005 UL_{34} | — | October 24, 2005 | Kitt Peak | Spacewatch | · | 570 m | MPC · JPL |
| 455859 | 2005 UR_{37} | — | October 24, 2005 | Kitt Peak | Spacewatch | HOF | 2.4 km | MPC · JPL |
| 455860 | 2005 US_{41} | — | October 27, 2005 | Mount Graham | Ryan, W. H. | · | 1.7 km | MPC · JPL |
| 455861 | 2005 UN_{42} | — | October 22, 2005 | Kitt Peak | Spacewatch | · | 780 m | MPC · JPL |
| 455862 | 2005 UL_{46} | — | October 22, 2005 | Kitt Peak | Spacewatch | EUN | 1.5 km | MPC · JPL |
| 455863 | 2005 US_{48} | — | October 22, 2005 | Kitt Peak | Spacewatch | · | 1.6 km | MPC · JPL |
| 455864 | 2005 UT_{60} | — | October 25, 2005 | Mount Lemmon | Mount Lemmon Survey | · | 440 m | MPC · JPL |
| 455865 | 2005 UQ_{71} | — | October 10, 2005 | Catalina | CSS | · | 2.0 km | MPC · JPL |
| 455866 | 2005 UB_{75} | — | October 24, 2005 | Kitt Peak | Spacewatch | · | 1.7 km | MPC · JPL |
| 455867 | 2005 UO_{76} | — | August 30, 2005 | Kitt Peak | Spacewatch | · | 2.3 km | MPC · JPL |
| 455868 | 2005 UY_{77} | — | October 25, 2005 | Anderson Mesa | LONEOS | JUN | 1.3 km | MPC · JPL |
| 455869 | 2005 UJ_{78} | — | October 2, 2005 | Mount Lemmon | Mount Lemmon Survey | · | 1.5 km | MPC · JPL |
| 455870 | 2005 UX_{83} | — | October 22, 2005 | Kitt Peak | Spacewatch | · | 610 m | MPC · JPL |
| 455871 | 2005 UP_{89} | — | August 30, 2005 | Kitt Peak | Spacewatch | · | 1.7 km | MPC · JPL |
| 455872 | 2005 UT_{89} | — | October 22, 2005 | Kitt Peak | Spacewatch | · | 1.7 km | MPC · JPL |
| 455873 | 2005 UZ_{91} | — | October 22, 2005 | Kitt Peak | Spacewatch | · | 2.2 km | MPC · JPL |
| 455874 | 2005 UH_{94} | — | October 22, 2005 | Kitt Peak | Spacewatch | · | 1.8 km | MPC · JPL |
| 455875 | 2005 UO_{95} | — | October 22, 2005 | Kitt Peak | Spacewatch | · | 1.5 km | MPC · JPL |
| 455876 | 2005 UL_{101} | — | October 22, 2005 | Kitt Peak | Spacewatch | AGN | 1.3 km | MPC · JPL |
| 455877 | 2005 UM_{101} | — | October 22, 2005 | Kitt Peak | Spacewatch | · | 1.6 km | MPC · JPL |
| 455878 | 2005 UO_{102} | — | October 22, 2005 | Kitt Peak | Spacewatch | · | 2.0 km | MPC · JPL |
| 455879 | 2005 UN_{107} | — | October 22, 2005 | Kitt Peak | Spacewatch | · | 560 m | MPC · JPL |
| 455880 | 2005 UG_{110} | — | October 22, 2005 | Kitt Peak | Spacewatch | · | 1.9 km | MPC · JPL |
| 455881 | 2005 UP_{114} | — | October 1, 2005 | Socorro | LINEAR | · | 2.6 km | MPC · JPL |
| 455882 | 2005 UR_{116} | — | October 12, 2005 | Kitt Peak | Spacewatch | PAD | 1.2 km | MPC · JPL |
| 455883 | 2005 UH_{118} | — | October 5, 2005 | Kitt Peak | Spacewatch | AGN | 1.1 km | MPC · JPL |
| 455884 | 2005 UL_{118} | — | October 24, 2005 | Kitt Peak | Spacewatch | · | 1.5 km | MPC · JPL |
| 455885 | 2005 UP_{129} | — | October 24, 2005 | Kitt Peak | Spacewatch | · | 1.6 km | MPC · JPL |
| 455886 | 2005 UH_{137} | — | September 29, 2005 | Mount Lemmon | Mount Lemmon Survey | KOR | 1.0 km | MPC · JPL |
| 455887 Laurafallon | 2005 UC_{140} | Laurafallon | October 25, 2005 | Mount Lemmon | Mount Lemmon Survey | AGN | 1.1 km | MPC · JPL |
| 455888 | 2005 US_{151} | — | October 26, 2005 | Kitt Peak | Spacewatch | AGN | 1.0 km | MPC · JPL |
| 455889 | 2005 US_{152} | — | October 1, 2005 | Mount Lemmon | Mount Lemmon Survey | DOR | 2.1 km | MPC · JPL |
| 455890 | 2005 UP_{154} | — | October 26, 2005 | Kitt Peak | Spacewatch | · | 1.7 km | MPC · JPL |
| 455891 | 2005 UT_{154} | — | October 26, 2005 | Kitt Peak | Spacewatch | AGN | 1.1 km | MPC · JPL |
| 455892 | 2005 UV_{154} | — | October 26, 2005 | Kitt Peak | Spacewatch | · | 1.9 km | MPC · JPL |
| 455893 | 2005 UF_{155} | — | October 26, 2005 | Kitt Peak | Spacewatch | · | 2.0 km | MPC · JPL |
| 455894 | 2005 UD_{166} | — | October 24, 2005 | Kitt Peak | Spacewatch | · | 1.7 km | MPC · JPL |
| 455895 | 2005 UO_{169} | — | October 24, 2005 | Kitt Peak | Spacewatch | · | 1.6 km | MPC · JPL |
| 455896 | 2005 UC_{171} | — | October 24, 2005 | Kitt Peak | Spacewatch | · | 1.7 km | MPC · JPL |
| 455897 | 2005 UH_{174} | — | October 24, 2005 | Kitt Peak | Spacewatch | · | 2.2 km | MPC · JPL |
| 455898 | 2005 UW_{176} | — | October 24, 2005 | Kitt Peak | Spacewatch | · | 1.6 km | MPC · JPL |
| 455899 | 2005 UL_{178} | — | October 24, 2005 | Kitt Peak | Spacewatch | · | 1.6 km | MPC · JPL |
| 455900 | 2005 UR_{179} | — | October 24, 2005 | Kitt Peak | Spacewatch | KOR | 1.1 km | MPC · JPL |

== 455901–456000 ==
back to top

| Designation | | | Discovery | | | Properties | | Ref |
| Permanent | Provisional | Named after | Date | Site | Discoverer(s) | Category | Diam. | Ref |
|---|---|---|---|---|---|---|---|---|
| 455901 | 2005 UA_{187} | — | October 26, 2005 | Kitt Peak | Spacewatch | AGN | 1.3 km | MPC · JPL |
| 455902 | 2005 UX_{190} | — | October 27, 2005 | Mount Lemmon | Mount Lemmon Survey | · | 1.5 km | MPC · JPL |
| 455903 | 2005 UF_{192} | — | October 27, 2005 | Mount Lemmon | Mount Lemmon Survey | · | 1.9 km | MPC · JPL |
| 455904 | 2005 UV_{195} | — | October 1, 2005 | Kitt Peak | Spacewatch | · | 1.5 km | MPC · JPL |
| 455905 | 2005 UU_{196} | — | October 24, 2005 | Kitt Peak | Spacewatch | · | 1.7 km | MPC · JPL |
| 455906 | 2005 UY_{196} | — | October 1, 2005 | Mount Lemmon | Mount Lemmon Survey | · | 1.7 km | MPC · JPL |
| 455907 | 2005 UV_{200} | — | October 25, 2005 | Kitt Peak | Spacewatch | DOR | 1.8 km | MPC · JPL |
| 455908 | 2005 UY_{211} | — | October 27, 2005 | Kitt Peak | Spacewatch | · | 2.0 km | MPC · JPL |
| 455909 | 2005 UD_{220} | — | October 25, 2005 | Kitt Peak | Spacewatch | · | 1.5 km | MPC · JPL |
| 455910 | 2005 UW_{221} | — | October 25, 2005 | Kitt Peak | Spacewatch | · | 1.7 km | MPC · JPL |
| 455911 | 2005 UL_{222} | — | October 25, 2005 | Kitt Peak | Spacewatch | DOR | 2.2 km | MPC · JPL |
| 455912 | 2005 UP_{223} | — | October 25, 2005 | Kitt Peak | Spacewatch | · | 1.7 km | MPC · JPL |
| 455913 | 2005 UQ_{223} | — | October 25, 2005 | Kitt Peak | Spacewatch | AGN | 980 m | MPC · JPL |
| 455914 | 2005 US_{224} | — | October 25, 2005 | Kitt Peak | Spacewatch | · | 1.7 km | MPC · JPL |
| 455915 | 2005 UX_{231} | — | October 25, 2005 | Mount Lemmon | Mount Lemmon Survey | · | 1.4 km | MPC · JPL |
| 455916 | 2005 UJ_{247} | — | October 28, 2005 | Mount Lemmon | Mount Lemmon Survey | · | 1.7 km | MPC · JPL |
| 455917 | 2005 UT_{253} | — | October 23, 2005 | Catalina | CSS | · | 2.7 km | MPC · JPL |
| 455918 | 2005 UP_{254} | — | October 22, 2005 | Kitt Peak | Spacewatch | · | 1.9 km | MPC · JPL |
| 455919 | 2005 UM_{257} | — | October 25, 2005 | Kitt Peak | Spacewatch | · | 1.3 km | MPC · JPL |
| 455920 | 2005 UJ_{260} | — | October 25, 2005 | Kitt Peak | Spacewatch | · | 1.6 km | MPC · JPL |
| 455921 | 2005 UE_{262} | — | October 26, 2005 | Kitt Peak | Spacewatch | · | 1.6 km | MPC · JPL |
| 455922 | 2005 UC_{268} | — | October 27, 2005 | Bergisch Gladbach | W. Bickel | · | 900 m | MPC · JPL |
| 455923 | 2005 UB_{276} | — | October 24, 2005 | Kitt Peak | Spacewatch | AGN | 1.0 km | MPC · JPL |
| 455924 | 2005 UW_{285} | — | September 25, 2005 | Kitt Peak | Spacewatch | GEF | 990 m | MPC · JPL |
| 455925 | 2005 UY_{292} | — | October 26, 2005 | Kitt Peak | Spacewatch | HOF | 2.3 km | MPC · JPL |
| 455926 | 2005 UN_{294} | — | October 26, 2005 | Kitt Peak | Spacewatch | · | 740 m | MPC · JPL |
| 455927 | 2005 UC_{298} | — | October 26, 2005 | Kitt Peak | Spacewatch | · | 1.9 km | MPC · JPL |
| 455928 | 2005 UF_{298} | — | October 1, 2005 | Mount Lemmon | Mount Lemmon Survey | · | 1.5 km | MPC · JPL |
| 455929 | 2005 US_{311} | — | October 12, 2005 | Kitt Peak | Spacewatch | · | 1.3 km | MPC · JPL |
| 455930 | 2005 UW_{317} | — | October 27, 2005 | Kitt Peak | Spacewatch | · | 1.5 km | MPC · JPL |
| 455931 | 2005 UO_{326} | — | October 29, 2005 | Kitt Peak | Spacewatch | · | 1.6 km | MPC · JPL |
| 455932 | 2005 UB_{330} | — | October 28, 2005 | Kitt Peak | Spacewatch | KOR | 1.1 km | MPC · JPL |
| 455933 | 2005 UG_{339} | — | October 23, 2005 | Catalina | CSS | · | 1.6 km | MPC · JPL |
| 455934 | 2005 UX_{350} | — | September 30, 2005 | Catalina | CSS | EUN | 1.1 km | MPC · JPL |
| 455935 | 2005 UF_{365} | — | October 27, 2005 | Kitt Peak | Spacewatch | MRX | 960 m | MPC · JPL |
| 455936 | 2005 UZ_{373} | — | October 27, 2005 | Kitt Peak | Spacewatch | · | 2.4 km | MPC · JPL |
| 455937 | 2005 UT_{375} | — | October 27, 2005 | Kitt Peak | Spacewatch | · | 2.2 km | MPC · JPL |
| 455938 | 2005 UY_{377} | — | October 28, 2005 | Mount Lemmon | Mount Lemmon Survey | · | 430 m | MPC · JPL |
| 455939 | 2005 UM_{415} | — | October 25, 2005 | Kitt Peak | Spacewatch | AGN | 1.3 km | MPC · JPL |
| 455940 | 2005 US_{415} | — | October 25, 2005 | Kitt Peak | Spacewatch | · | 1.5 km | MPC · JPL |
| 455941 | 2005 UU_{422} | — | October 27, 2005 | Mount Lemmon | Mount Lemmon Survey | · | 570 m | MPC · JPL |
| 455942 | 2005 UC_{428} | — | October 28, 2005 | Kitt Peak | Spacewatch | · | 680 m | MPC · JPL |
| 455943 | 2005 UH_{428} | — | October 28, 2005 | Kitt Peak | Spacewatch | · | 1.7 km | MPC · JPL |
| 455944 | 2005 UU_{431} | — | October 28, 2005 | Kitt Peak | Spacewatch | · | 1.9 km | MPC · JPL |
| 455945 | 2005 UA_{433} | — | October 28, 2005 | Kitt Peak | Spacewatch | HOF | 2.0 km | MPC · JPL |
| 455946 | 2005 UX_{439} | — | October 23, 2005 | Catalina | CSS | · | 2.2 km | MPC · JPL |
| 455947 | 2005 US_{443} | — | October 30, 2005 | Socorro | LINEAR | GEF | 1.3 km | MPC · JPL |
| 455948 | 2005 UH_{455} | — | September 13, 2005 | Socorro | LINEAR | · | 2.2 km | MPC · JPL |
| 455949 | 2005 US_{479} | — | October 31, 2005 | Catalina | CSS | · | 2.4 km | MPC · JPL |
| 455950 | 2005 UL_{487} | — | October 23, 2005 | Catalina | CSS | · | 1.7 km | MPC · JPL |
| 455951 | 2005 UQ_{504} | — | October 24, 2005 | Mauna Kea | D. J. Tholen | · | 2.9 km | MPC · JPL |
| 455952 | 2005 UZ_{510} | — | October 26, 2005 | Kitt Peak | Spacewatch | · | 580 m | MPC · JPL |
| 455953 | 2005 UB_{516} | — | October 22, 2005 | Apache Point | A. C. Becker | · | 1.6 km | MPC · JPL |
| 455954 | 2005 UA_{526} | — | October 28, 2005 | Mount Lemmon | Mount Lemmon Survey | · | 1.6 km | MPC · JPL |
| 455955 | 2005 UD_{526} | — | October 29, 2005 | Mount Lemmon | Mount Lemmon Survey | AGN | 1.1 km | MPC · JPL |
| 455956 | 2005 VE | — | November 1, 2005 | Mount Lemmon | Mount Lemmon Survey | APO | 250 m | MPC · JPL |
| 455957 | 2005 VH_{16} | — | October 29, 2005 | Catalina | CSS | · | 2.0 km | MPC · JPL |
| 455958 | 2005 VX_{18} | — | October 12, 2005 | Kitt Peak | Spacewatch | KOR | 1.0 km | MPC · JPL |
| 455959 | 2005 VW_{21} | — | October 25, 2005 | Kitt Peak | Spacewatch | KOR | 1.2 km | MPC · JPL |
| 455960 | 2005 VP_{59} | — | October 25, 2005 | Kitt Peak | Spacewatch | KOR | 1.1 km | MPC · JPL |
| 455961 | 2005 VR_{76} | — | September 29, 2005 | Catalina | CSS | · | 2.1 km | MPC · JPL |
| 455962 | 2005 VQ_{89} | — | October 25, 2005 | Kitt Peak | Spacewatch | · | 1.3 km | MPC · JPL |
| 455963 | 2005 VY_{94} | — | November 6, 2005 | Kitt Peak | Spacewatch | · | 710 m | MPC · JPL |
| 455964 | 2005 VV_{98} | — | November 10, 2005 | Catalina | CSS | · | 2.2 km | MPC · JPL |
| 455965 | 2005 VU_{107} | — | November 5, 2005 | Kitt Peak | Spacewatch | · | 520 m | MPC · JPL |
| 455966 | 2005 VH_{108} | — | October 25, 2005 | Kitt Peak | Spacewatch | · | 1.7 km | MPC · JPL |
| 455967 | 2005 VA_{113} | — | October 28, 2005 | Kitt Peak | Spacewatch | · | 1.6 km | MPC · JPL |
| 455968 | 2005 VU_{114} | — | November 11, 2005 | Kitt Peak | Spacewatch | · | 1.9 km | MPC · JPL |
| 455969 | 2005 VD_{115} | — | October 24, 2005 | Kitt Peak | Spacewatch | · | 2.0 km | MPC · JPL |
| 455970 | 2005 VX_{115} | — | November 11, 2005 | Kitt Peak | Spacewatch | · | 2.5 km | MPC · JPL |
| 455971 | 2005 VP_{127} | — | November 1, 2005 | Apache Point | A. C. Becker | · | 1.3 km | MPC · JPL |
| 455972 | 2005 WE_{15} | — | November 22, 2005 | Kitt Peak | Spacewatch | · | 2.2 km | MPC · JPL |
| 455973 | 2005 WH_{18} | — | November 1, 2005 | Mount Lemmon | Mount Lemmon Survey | · | 1.7 km | MPC · JPL |
| 455974 | 2005 WN_{22} | — | November 21, 2005 | Kitt Peak | Spacewatch | · | 1.6 km | MPC · JPL |
| 455975 | 2005 WT_{23} | — | October 28, 2005 | Mount Lemmon | Mount Lemmon Survey | · | 1.7 km | MPC · JPL |
| 455976 | 2005 WP_{25} | — | November 21, 2005 | Kitt Peak | Spacewatch | · | 490 m | MPC · JPL |
| 455977 | 2005 WW_{32} | — | November 21, 2005 | Kitt Peak | Spacewatch | · | 1.9 km | MPC · JPL |
| 455978 | 2005 WT_{45} | — | November 12, 2005 | Kitt Peak | Spacewatch | · | 1.9 km | MPC · JPL |
| 455979 | 2005 WK_{66} | — | October 25, 2005 | Mount Lemmon | Mount Lemmon Survey | · | 1.5 km | MPC · JPL |
| 455980 | 2005 WJ_{70} | — | October 30, 2005 | Mount Lemmon | Mount Lemmon Survey | · | 1.5 km | MPC · JPL |
| 455981 | 2005 WE_{82} | — | November 28, 2005 | Catalina | CSS | · | 740 m | MPC · JPL |
| 455982 | 2005 WH_{101} | — | November 22, 2005 | Kitt Peak | Spacewatch | · | 2.0 km | MPC · JPL |
| 455983 | 2005 WC_{108} | — | November 3, 2005 | Mount Lemmon | Mount Lemmon Survey | · | 930 m | MPC · JPL |
| 455984 | 2005 WU_{108} | — | October 1, 2005 | Catalina | CSS | · | 2.1 km | MPC · JPL |
| 455985 | 2005 WW_{108} | — | October 10, 2005 | Catalina | CSS | DOR | 1.9 km | MPC · JPL |
| 455986 | 2005 WH_{119} | — | October 31, 2005 | Kitt Peak | Spacewatch | · | 2.6 km | MPC · JPL |
| 455987 | 2005 WK_{124} | — | November 6, 2005 | Mount Lemmon | Mount Lemmon Survey | · | 1.5 km | MPC · JPL |
| 455988 | 2005 WK_{127} | — | October 24, 2005 | Kitt Peak | Spacewatch | · | 2.1 km | MPC · JPL |
| 455989 | 2005 WL_{152} | — | November 29, 2005 | Kitt Peak | Spacewatch | · | 1.6 km | MPC · JPL |
| 455990 | 2005 WT_{157} | — | November 25, 2005 | Mount Lemmon | Mount Lemmon Survey | · | 810 m | MPC · JPL |
| 455991 | 2005 WD_{162} | — | November 1, 2005 | Mount Lemmon | Mount Lemmon Survey | · | 1.9 km | MPC · JPL |
| 455992 | 2005 WM_{182} | — | November 6, 2005 | Mount Lemmon | Mount Lemmon Survey | · | 1.9 km | MPC · JPL |
| 455993 | 2005 WN_{189} | — | November 30, 2005 | Kitt Peak | Spacewatch | · | 540 m | MPC · JPL |
| 455994 | 2005 XU_{1} | — | October 10, 2005 | Kitt Peak | Spacewatch | DOR | 1.5 km | MPC · JPL |
| 455995 | 2005 XX_{29} | — | December 1, 2005 | Kitt Peak | Spacewatch | · | 560 m | MPC · JPL |
| 455996 | 2005 XE_{67} | — | November 26, 2005 | Mount Lemmon | Mount Lemmon Survey | KOR | 1.4 km | MPC · JPL |
| 455997 | 2005 XG_{68} | — | November 25, 2005 | Kitt Peak | Spacewatch | · | 2.0 km | MPC · JPL |
| 455998 | 2005 XF_{77} | — | October 6, 2005 | Mount Lemmon | Mount Lemmon Survey | · | 1.9 km | MPC · JPL |
| 455999 | 2005 XA_{84} | — | October 27, 2005 | Mount Lemmon | Mount Lemmon Survey | · | 3.0 km | MPC · JPL |
| 456000 | 2005 XA_{109} | — | December 1, 2005 | Kitt Peak | M. W. Buie | HOF | 2.4 km | MPC · JPL |

back to top

== Meaning of names ==
As minor planet discoveries are confirmed, they are given a permanent number by the IAU's Minor Planet Center (MPC), and the discoverers can then submit names for them, following the IAU's naming conventions. The list below concerns those minor planets in the specified number-range that have received names, and explains the meanings of those names.

Official naming citations of newly named small Solar System bodies are approved and published in a bulletin by IAU's Working Group for Small Bodies Nomenclature (WGSBN). Before May 2021, citations were published in MPC's Minor Planet Circulars for many decades. Recent citations can also be found on the JPL Small-Body Database (SBDB). Until his death in 2016, German astronomer Lutz D. Schmadel compiled these citations into the Dictionary of Minor Planet Names (DMP) and regularly updated the collection.

Based on Paul Herget's The Names of the Minor Planets, Schmadel also researched the unclear origin of numerous asteroids, most of which had been named prior to World War II. This article incorporates text from this source, which is in the public domain: SBDB New namings may only be added to this list below after official publication as the preannouncement of names is condemned. The WGSBN publishes a comprehensive guideline for the naming rules of non-cometary small Solar System bodies.

| Named minor planet | Provisional | This minor planet was named for... | Ref · Catalog |
|---|---|---|---|
| 455207 Kellyyoder | 2001 FU_{201} | Kelly Yoder (b. 1963) worked as the sponsored projects manager at the Planetary Science Institute for over twenty years. | IAU · 455207 |
| 455739 Isabelita | 2005 JG_{2} | Isabel Izquierdo Lacruz (born 1988), the niece of Spanish discoverer Juan Lacruz | JPL · 455739 |
| 455887 Laurafallon | 2005 UC_{140} | Laura Elizabeth Fallon, American mental-health counselor, Grand Canyon River guide, yoga instructor and theater professional. | IAU · 455887 |
