= Stanley Dermott =

British-American astromer

Stanley F. Dermott
- Born: 14 August 1942 (age 84)
- Died: 20 May 2025
- Education: University College London
- Known for: Dermott's Law
- Scientific career
- Fields: Celestial Mechanics
- Workplaces: University of Florida
- Thesis: Topics relating to the dynamical evolution of the solar system (1975)
- Doctoral students: Renu Malhotra

Stanley Dermott (born August 14, 1942, deceased May 20, 2025) was a British-American astrophysicist and educator. He was part of the faculty at the University of Florida since 1989 including holding a research foundation professorship from 1997 to 2000 and serving as chair of the department of astronomy from 1993 to 2009. In 2002 he was awarded the degree of Doctor of Science by the University of London in the field of Solar System dynamics.

He is credited with the identification of Dermott's law which is named after him. His body of work also includes contributions to the study of planetary origins, zodiacal dust bands, resonance effects of planetary satellites, mechanics of planetary rings, tidal interactions, the statistics of asteroid rotation rates, and the dynamical structure of the asteroid belt.

The main-belt asteroid 3647 Dermott was formally named after him on January 11, 1986.
