= Renu Malhotra =

American planetary scientist

- Born: 1961 (age 64–65); New Delhi, India
- Education: IIT Delhi (MS); Cornell University (PhD)
- Known for: Planet migration in the Solar system
- Scientific career
- Workplaces: University of Arizona
- Doctoral advisor: Stanley Dermott
- Website: https://www.lpl.arizona.edu/~renu/

Renu Malhotra (born 1961) is an American planetary scientist from India, known for using the orbital resonance between Pluto and Neptune to infer large-scale orbital migration of the giant planets and to predict the existence of Plutinos in resonance with Neptune. The asteroid 6698 Malhotra was named for her on 14 December 1997 (M.P.C. 31025). She is credited by the Minor Planet Center with the co-discovery of (455206) 2001 FE193, a trans-Neptunian object in the Kuiper belt.

== Early life and career ==
Minor planets discovered: 1
(455206) 2001 FE193	27 March 2001	MPC

Renu Malhotra was born in New Delhi in 1961. Her father was an aircraft engineer at Indian Airlines. Her family moved to Hyderabad when she was a child. She attended the Indian Institute of Technology Delhi, graduating with an M.S. degree in Physics in 1983. Malhotra then attended Cornell University, where she was introduced to non-linear dynamics by Mitchell Feigenbaum. She received her Ph.D. degree in Physics from Cornell in 1988, with Stanley Dermott as her doctoral advisor. With the help of Peter Goldreich who had read her paper on the moons of Uranus, she obtained a postdoctoral research position at California Institute of Technology. She then worked for nine years at Lunar and Planetary Institute, where she completed work on Pluto's orbital resonance and predicted the resonant structure of the Kuiper Belt. Malhotra is currently a professor at the University of Arizona's Lunar and Planetary Laboratory.

== Awards and honors ==
- 1997 Harold C. Urey Prize
- 2006 Outstanding Alumnus Award from Indian Institute of Technology Delhi
- 2010 Galileo Circle Fellow, University of Arizona
- 2015 American Academy of Arts and Sciences
- 2015 National Academy of Sciences
- 2016 Louise Foucar Marshall Science Research Professor
- 2016 Regents' Professor, University of Arizona

== See also ==
- List of minor planet discoverers § R. Malhotra
