= List of exceptional set concepts =

This is a list of exceptional set concepts. In mathematics, and in particular in mathematical analysis, it is very useful to be able to characterise subsets of a given set X as 'small', in some definite sense, or 'large' if their complement in X is small. There are numerous concepts that have been introduced to study 'small' or 'exceptional' subsets. In the case of sets of natural numbers, it is possible to define more than one concept of 'density', for example. See also list of properties of sets of reals.

- Almost all
- Almost always
- Almost everywhere
- Almost never
- Almost surely
- Analytic capacity
- Closed unbounded set
- Cofinal (mathematics)
- Cofinite
- Dense set
- IP set
- 2-large
- Large set (Ramsey theory)
- Meagre set
- Measure zero
- Natural density
- Negligible set
- Nowhere dense set
- Null set, conull set
- Partition regular
- Piecewise syndetic set
- Schnirelmann density
- Small set (combinatorics)
- Stationary set
- Syndetic set
- Thick set
- Thin set (Serre)
