= List of scientific laws named after people =

This is a list of scientific laws named after people (eponymous laws). For other lists of eponyms, see eponym.

Law	Field	Person(s) Named After
Abel's theorem	Calculus	Niels Henrik Abel
Ariadne's thread	Computer science	Ariadne
Amdahl's law	Computer science	Gene Amdahl
Ampère's circuital law	Physics	André-Marie Ampère
Archie's law	Geology	Gus Archie
Archimedes' principle Axiom of Archimedes	Physics; Analysis	Archimedes
Arrhenius equation	Chemical kinetics	Svante Arrhenius
Avogadro's law	Thermodynamics	Amedeo Avogadro
Basquin's Law of Fatigue	Material science	O. H. Basquin
Bell's theorem	Quantum mechanics	John Stewart Bell
Benford's law	Mathematics	Frank Benford
Beer–Lambert law	Optics	August Beer, Johann Heinrich Lambert
Bernoulli's principle Bernoulli's equation	Physical sciences	Daniel Bernoulli
Biot–Savart law	Electromagnetics, fluid dynamics	Jean Baptiste Biot and Félix Savart
Birch's law	Geophysics	Francis Birch
Bogoliubov–Born–Green–Kirkwood–Yvon hierarchy	Physics	Nikolay Bogoliubov, Max Born, Herbert Green, John Kirkwood, and J. Yvon
Bogoliubov transformation	Quantum mechanics	Nikolay Bogoliubov
Boltzmann equation	Thermodynamics	Ludwig Boltzmann
Born's law	Quantum mechanics	Max Born
Boyle's law	Thermodynamics	Robert Boyle
Bragg's Law	Physics	William Lawrence Bragg, William Henry Bragg
Bradford's law	Computer science	Samuel C. Bradford
Bruun Rule	Earth science	Per Bruun
Buys Ballot's law	Meteorology	C.H.D. Buys Ballot
Byerlee's law	Geophysics	James Byerlee
Carnot's theorem	Thermodynamics	Nicolas Léonard Sadi Carnot
Cauchy's integral formula Cauchy–Riemann equations See also: List of things named after Augustin-Louis Cauchy	Complex analysis	Augustin Louis Cauchy; Augustin Louis Cauchy and Bernhard Riemann
Cayley–Hamilton theorem	Linear algebra	Arthur Cayley and William Hamilton
Charles's law	Thermodynamics	Jacques Charles
Chandrasekhar limit	Astrophysics	Subrahmanyan Chandrasekhar
Church–Turing thesis	Computer science	Alonzo Church and Alan Turing
Coulomb's law	Physics	Charles Augustin de Coulomb
Law of Charles and Gay-Lussac (frequently called Charles's law)	Thermodynamics	Jacques Charles and Joseph Louis Gay-Lussac
Clifford's theorem Clifford's circle theorems	Algebraic geometry, Geometry	William Kingdon Clifford
Curie's law	Physics	Pierre Curie
Curie–Weiss law	Physics	Pierre Curie and Pierre-Ernest Weiss
D'Alembert's paradox D'Alembert's principle	Fluid dynamics, Physics	Jean le Rond d'Alembert
Dalton's law of partial pressure	Thermodynamics	John Dalton
Darcy's law	Fluid mechanics	Henry Darcy
De Bruijn–Erdős theorem	Mathematics	Nicolaas Govert de Bruijn and Paul Erdős
De Morgan's law	Logic	Augustus De Morgan
Dermott's law	Celestial mechanics	Stanley Dermott
Descartes's theorem	Geometry	René Descartes
Dirac equation Dirac delta function Dirac comb Dirac spinor Dirac operator See also: List of things named after Paul Dirac	Mathematics, Physics	Paul Adrien Maurice Dirac
Drake equation	Cosmology	Frank Drake
Doppler effect	Physics	Christian Doppler
Ehrenfest's theorem	Quantum mechanics	Paul Ehrenfest
Einstein's general theory of relativity Einstein's special theory of relativity See also: List of things named after Albert Einstein	Physics	Albert Einstein
El-Sayed rule	Physical chemistry	Mostafa El-Sayed
Erdős–Anning theorem See also: List of things named after Paul Erdős	Mathematics	Paul Erdős and Norman H. Anning
Erdős–Beck theorem	Mathematics	Paul Erdős and József Beck
Erdős–Gallai theorem	Mathematics	Paul Erdős and Tibor Gallai
Erdős–Kac theorem	Mathematics	Paul Erdős and Mark Kac
Erdős–Ko–Rado theorem	Mathematics	Paul Erdős, Ke Zhao, and Richard Rado
Erdős–Nagy theorem	Mathematics	Paul Erdős and Béla Szőkefalvi-Nagy
Erdős–Rado theorem	Mathematics	Paul Erdős and Richard Rado
Erdős–Stone theorem	Mathematics	Paul Erdős and Arthur Harold Stone
Erdős–Szekeres theorem	Mathematics	Paul Erdős and George Szekeres
Erdős–Szemerédi theorem	Mathematics	Paul Erdős and Endre Szemerédi
Euclid's theorem	Number theory	Euclid
Euler's theorem See also: List of things named after Leonhard Euler	Number theory	Leonhard Euler
Faraday's law of induction Faraday's law of electrolysis	Electromagnetism; Chemistry	Michael Faraday
Faxén's law	Fluid dynamics	Hilding Faxén
Fermat's principle Fermat's Last Theorem; Fermat's little theorem	Optics; Number theory Number theory	Pierre de Fermat
Fermi paradox Fermi's golden rule Fermi acceleration Fermi hole Fermionic field Fermi level See also: List of things named after Enrico Fermi	Cosmology, Physics	Enrico Fermi
Fick's law of diffusion	Thermodynamics	Adolf Fick
Fitts's law	Ergonomics	Paul Fitts
Fourier's law	Thermodynamics	Jean Baptiste Joseph Fourier
Gauss's law Gauss's law for magnetism Gauss's principle of least constraint Gauss's digamma theorem Gauss's hypergeometric theorem Gaussian function See also: List of things named after Carl Friedrich Gauss	Mathematics, Physics	Johann Carl Friedrich Gauss
Gay-Lussac's law	Chemistry	Joseph Louis Gay-Lussac
Gibbs–Helmholtz equation	Thermodynamics	Josiah Willard Gibbs, Hermann Ludwig Ferdinand von Helmholtz
Gödel's incompleteness theorems	Mathematics	Kurt Gödel
Graham's law	Thermodynamics	Thomas Graham
Green's law	Fluid dynamics	George Green
Grimm's law	Linguistics	Jacob and Wilhelm Grimm
Gustafson's law	Computer science	John L. Gustafson
Heisenberg's uncertainty principle	Theoretical physics	Werner Heisenberg
Haüy's law of rational indices Haüy's law of symmetry	Crystallography	René Just Haüy
Heaps' law	Linguistics	Harold Stanley Heaps
Hellmann–Feynman theorem	Physics	Hans Hellmann, Richard Feynman
Henry's law	Thermodynamics	William Henry
Hertz observations	Electromagnetism	Heinrich Hertz
Hess's law	Thermodynamics	Germain Henri Hess
Hilbert's basis theorem Hilbert's axioms Hilbert function Hilbert's irreducibility theorem Hilbert's syzygy theorem Hilbert's Theorem 90; Hilbert's theorem	Mathematics	David Hilbert
Hohenberg–Kohn theorem	Quantum mechanics	Pierre Hohenberg and Walter Kohn
Helmholtz's theorems Helmholtz theorem Helmholtz free energy Helmholtz decomposition Helmholtz equation Helmholtz resonance	Thermodynamics; Physics	Hermann von Helmholtz
Hollomon's law	Physics	John Herbert Hollomon
Hooke's law	Physics	Robert Hooke
Hopkinson's law	Electromagnetism	John Hopkinson
Hubble's law	Cosmology	Edwin Hubble
Hund's rules	Atomic physics	Friedrich Hund
Huygens–Fresnel principle	Optics	Christiaan Huygens and Augustin-Jean Fresnel
Joule's laws	Physics	James Joule
Jurin's law	Physics	James Jurin
Kasha's rule	Photochemistry	Michael Kasha
Kepler's laws of planetary motion	Astrophysics	Johannes Kepler
Kirchhoff's laws	Electronics, thermodynamics	Gustav Kirchhoff
Kopp's law	Thermodynamics	Hermann Franz Moritz Kopp
Larmor formula	Physics	Joseph Larmor
Leidenfrost effect	Physics	Johann Gottlob Leidenfrost
Lagrangian point Lagrange reversion theorem Lagrange polynomial Lagrange's four-square theorem Lagrange's theorem Lagrange's theorem (group theory); Lagrange invariant Lagrange multiplier See also: List of things named after Joseph-Louis Lagrange	Mathematics, Astrophysics	Joseph-Louis Lagrange
Lambert's cosine law	Physics	Johann Heinrich Lambert
Lamm equation	Chemistry, Biophysics	Ole Lamm
Langmuir equation	Surface Chemistry	Irving Langmuir
Laplace transform Laplace's equation Laplace operator Laplace distribution Laplace invariant Laplace expansion Laplace principle Laplace limit See also: List of things named after Pierre-Simon Laplace	Mathematics; Physics; Probability Theory; Statistical mechanics	Pierre-Simon Laplace
Le Chatelier's principle	Chemistry	Henri Louis le Chatelier
Leibniz's law	Ontology	Gottfried Wilhelm Leibniz
Lenz's law	Physics	Heinrich Lenz
Leonard–Merritt mass estimator	Astrophysics	Peter Leonard, David Merritt
l'Hôpital's rule	Mathematics	Guillaume de l'Hôpital
Llinás's law	Neuroscience	Rodolfo Llinás
Ludwik's law	Physics	P. Ludwik
Mach principle Mach reflection	Physics	Ernst Mach
Marconi's law	Radio technology	Guglielmo Marconi
Markovnikov's rule	Organic chemistry	Vladimir Markovnikov
Maupertuis's principle	Mathematics	Pierre Louis Maupertuis
Maxwell's equations Maxwell relations	Electrodynamics; Thermodynamics	James Clerk Maxwell
McCulloch's Iron Laws of Conferences	Education	Alistair McCulloch
Mendelian inheritance/Mendel's laws	Genetics	Gregor Mendel
Metcalfe's law	Network theory	Robert Metcalfe
Mikheyev–Smirnov–Wolfenstein effect	Particle physics	Stanislav Mikheyev, Alexei Smirnov, and Lincoln Wolfenstein
Milner–Rado paradox	Mathematical logic	Eric Charles Milner and Richard Rado
Minkowski's theorem	Number theory	Hermann Minkowski
Mitscherlich's law	Crystallography; Condensed matter physics	Eilhard Mitscherlich
Moore's law	Computing	Gordon Moore
Nash embedding theorem Nash equilibrium	Topology; Game Theory	John Forbes Nash
Nernst equation	Electrochemistry	Walther Nernst
Newton's law of cooling Newton's law of universal gravitation Newton's laws of motion See also: List of things named after Isaac Newton	Thermodynamics; Astrophysics; Mechanics	Isaac Newton
Niven's theorem	Mathematics	Ivan Niven
Noether's theorem	Theoretical physics	Emmy Noether
Nyquist–Shannon sampling theorem	Information theory	Harry Nyquist, Claude Elwood Shannon
Occam's razor	Philosophy of science	William of Ockham
Ohm's law	Electronics	Georg Ohm
Osipkov–Merritt model	Astrophysics	Leonid Osipkov, David Merritt
Ostwald dilution law	Physical chemistry	Wilhelm Ostwald
Paley–Wiener theorem	Mathematics	Raymond Paley and Norbert Wiener
Pareto distribution Pareto efficiency Pareto index Pareto principle	Economics	Vilfredo Pareto
Pascal's law Pascal's theorem	Physics; Geometry	Blaise Pascal
Pauli exclusion principle	Quantum mechanics	Wolfgang Pauli
Peano axioms	Foundational mathematics	Giuseppe Peano
Planck's law	Electromagnetism	Max Planck
Poincaré–Bendixson theorem	Mathematics	Henri Poincaré and Ivar Otto Bendixson
Poincaré–Birkhoff–Witt theorem	Mathematics	Henri Poincaré, George David Birkhoff, and Ernst Witt
Poincaré–Hopf theorem	Mathematics	Henri Poincaré and Heinz Hopf
Poincaré recurrence theorem Poincaré conjecture Poincaré lemma See also: List of things named after Henri Poincaré	Mathematics	Henri Poincaré
Poiseuille's law	Fluidics	Jean Léonard Marie Poiseuille
Poisson distribution Poisson's equation See also: List of things named after Siméon Denis Poisson	Statistics; Calculus	Siméon Denis Poisson
Price's theorem	Natural selection	George R. Price
Ptolemy's theorem	Geometry	Ptolemy
Pythagorean theorem	Geometry	Pythagoras
Raman scattering	Physics	Sir Chandrasekhara Venkata Raman
Rado's theorem	Discrete mathematics	Richard Rado
Ramanujan–Nagell equation See also: List of things named after Srinivasa Ramanujan	Mathematics	Srinivasa Ramanujan and Trygve Nagell
Raoult's law	Physical chemistry	François-Marie Raoult
Riemann zeta function Riemann hypothesis Riemann integral Riemann lemma Riemannian manifold Riemann sphere Riemann theta function See also: List of things named after Bernhard Riemann	Number theory, analysis, geometry	Bernhard Riemann
Rolle's theorem	Differential calculus	Michel Rolle
Saha ionization equation	Plasma physics	Meghnad Saha
Schrödinger equation	Physics	Erwin Schrödinger
Seebeck effect	Physics, Electronincs	Thomas Johann Seebeck
Sérsic's law	Astrophysics	José Luis Sérsic
Snell's law	Optics	Willebrord van Roijen Snell
Sokolov–Ternov effect	Particle Physics	Arsenij Sokolov and Igor Ternov
Sommerfeld–Kossel displacement law	Spectroscopy	Arnold Sommerfeld and Walther Kossel
Stefan–Boltzmann law	Thermodynamics	Jožef Stefan and Ludwig Boltzmann
Steno's law	Mineralogy, crystallography	Nicolas Steno
Stokes' law	Fluid mechanics	George Gabriel Stokes
Stoletov's law	Photoelectric effect	Aleksandr Stoletov
Swift's law	Physics	H. W. Swift
Tarski's undefinability theorem Tarski's axioms See also: List of things named after Alfred Tarski	Mathematical logic, Geometry	Alfred Tarski
Thales's theorem	Geometry	Thales
Titius–Bode law	Astrophysics	Johann Daniel Titius and Johann Elert Bode
Torricelli's law	Physics	Evangelista Torricelli
Umov effect	Physics	Nikolay Umov
Van der Waals equation	Chemistry	Johannes Diderik van der Waals
Vlasov equation	Plasma physics	Anatoly Vlasov
Voce's law	Physics	E. Voce
Von Neumann bicommutant theorem Von Neumann entropy von Neumann paradox Von Neumann ergodic theorem Von Neumann universe Von Neumann neighborhood Von Neumann's trace inequality See also: List of things named after John von Neumann	Mathematics, Quantum mechanics	John von Neumann
Weinberg–Witten theorem	Quantum Gravity	Steven Weinberg and Edward Witten
Weyl character formula See also: List of things named after Hermann Weyl	Mathematics	Hermann Weyl
Wien's law	Physics	Wilhelm Wien
Wiener–Khinchin theorem	Mathematics	Norbert Wiener and Aleksandr Khinchin
Young–Laplace equation	Fluid dynamics	Thomas Young and Pierre-Simon Laplace
Zener–Hollomon law	Physics	Clarence Zener and John Herbert Hollomon
Zipf's law	Linguistics	George Kingsley Zipf

== See also ==
- Eponym
- Fields of science
- Glossary of sound laws in the Indo-European languages
- List of eponymous laws (overlaps with this list but includes non-scientific laws such as Murphy's law)
- List of legislation named for a person
- List of laws in science
- Lists of etymologies
- Scientific constants named after people
- Scientific phenomena named after people
- Stigler's law of eponymy
