= Neil Hindman =

American mathematician and professor emeritus

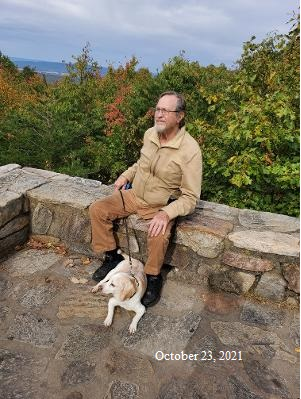
- Hindman in 2021
- Born: April 14, 1943 (age 83); Waukon, Iowa, U.S.
- Education: Westmar College (BA); University of Massachusetts (MA); Wesleyan University (Ph.D.)
- Scientific career
- Fields: Mathematics
- Workplaces: Howard University
- Thesis: P-like spaces and their product with P-spaces (1969)
- Doctoral advisor: William Wistar Comfort

Neil Hindman (born April 14, 1943) is an American mathematician and professor emeritus at Howard University. His research focuses on various areas within mathematics, including topology, Stone-Čech compactification, discrete systems, and Ramsey theory.

== Life and education ==
Neil Hindman actively participated in civil rights work during his college years. In the summer of 1964, he served as a freedom school coordinator in Mississippi.

Hindman completed his Bachelor of Arts degree in mathematics and physics in 1965 at Westmar College. He then pursued a graduate degree, earning a Master of Arts in mathematics from the University of Massachusetts in 1967. Subsequently, Hindman continued his academic journey at Wesleyan University, where he received his Ph.D. in 1969. Under the supervision of W. W. Comfort, Hindman wrote his doctoral thesis on "P-like spaces and their product with P-spaces."

== Academic career ==
Neil Hindman began his academic career as a visiting assistant professor at Wesleyan University, serving from September 1969 to June 1970. Following this, he joined California State University, Los Angeles, as an assistant professor in September 1970. From September 1975 to August 1976, Hindman held a visiting associate professorship at SUNY (The State University of New York) at Binghamton. By December 1979, he had risen to the rank of Professor at California State University, Los Angeles.

In January 1980, Hindman transitioned to Howard University, where he assumed the role of associate professor, continuing to impart knowledge in mathematics. He dedicated several decades to teaching and research at Howard University, ultimately retiring as a professor of Mathematics in June 2017.

== Mathematical work ==
One of Hindman's early contributions was his dissertation for his Ph.D. thesis, conducted in collaboration with W. W. Comfort and S. Negrepontis. Their research explored conditions for defining F'-spaces and investigated concepts such as weakly Lindelöf spaces and P-spaces, shedding light on the structure of F-spaces in topology. This pioneering work significantly advanced theoretical models and analytical techniques within the field.

Hindman's Theorem, formulated and proven by Neil Hindman, addresses a conjecture originally proposed by Graham and Rothschild. The theorem asserts that any partition of the natural numbers $\mathbb{N}$ into a finite number of classes contains at least one class with a sequence such that all finite sums of distinct elements from this sequence also belong to the same class. Hindman's Theorem confirms the conjecture by Graham and Rothschild and establishes its equivalence with the existence of an ultrafilter on $\mathbb{N}$. This theorem highlights the relationship between the partition regularity of the natural numbers and ultrafilters, offering a fundamental result with broad implications across various mathematical domains.

Hindman remains active in the fields of Ramsey Theory and Topology, with a particular focus on the Stone–Čech compactification.

== Awards and honors ==
- International Prize from the Japanese Association of Mathematical Science (2003)

== Selected publications ==
- Hindman, Neil. "Finite Sums from Sequences Within Cells of a Partition of N".
- Gordon, C.; Hindman Neil. "Elementary Set Theory – Proof Techniques". Hafner Press, New York, 1975.
- Hindman, Neil. "The Product of F-Space and P-Space."
- Comfort, W.W.; Hindman, Neil; Negrepontis, S. "F'-Spaces and their product with P-spaces."
