= Large set (Ramsey theory) =

Sets big enough to assert the existence of arithmetic progressions with common difference

In Ramsey theory, a set S of natural numbers is considered to be a large set if and only if Van der Waerden's theorem can be generalized to assert the existence of arithmetic progressions with common difference in S. That is, S is large if and only if every finite partition of the natural numbers has a cell containing arbitrarily long arithmetic progressions having common differences in S.

== Examples ==
- The natural numbers are large. This is precisely the assertion of Van der Waerden's theorem.
- The even numbers are large.

== Properties ==
Necessary conditions for largeness include:

- If S is large, for any natural number n, S must contain at least one multiple (equivalently, infinitely many multiples) of n.
- If $S=\{s_1,s_2,s_3,\dots\}$ is large, it is not the case that s_{k}≥3s_{k-1} for k≥ 2.

Two sufficient conditions are:

- If S contains n-cubes for arbitrarily large n, then S is large.
- If $S =p(\mathbb{N}) \cap \mathbb{N}$ where $p$ is a polynomial with $p(0)=0$ and positive leading coefficient, then $S$ is large.

The first sufficient condition implies that if S is a thick set, then S is large.

Other facts about large sets include:

- If S is large and F is finite, then S – F is large.
- $k\cdot \mathbb{N}=\{k,2k,3k,\dots\}$ is large.
- If S is large, $k\cdot S$ is also large.

If $S$ is large, then for any $m$, $S \cap \{ x : x \equiv 0\pmod{m} \}$ is large.

== 2-large and k-large sets ==
A set is k-large, for a natural number k > 0, when it meets the conditions for largeness when the restatement of van der Waerden's theorem is concerned only with k-colorings. Every set is either large or k-large for some maximal k. This follows from two important, albeit trivially true, facts:

- k-largeness implies (k-1)-largeness for k>1
- k-largeness for all k implies largeness.

It is unknown whether there are 2-large sets that are not also large sets. Brown, Graham, and Landman (1999) conjecture that no such sets exists. In 2026, Ryan Alweiss and Sohail Farhangi posted a preprint claiming to disprove this conjecture by constructing a set that is 2-large but not 3-large. They also showed that the family of 2-large sets is not partition regular, answering another question of Brown, Graham, and Landman.

== See also ==
- Partition of a set
