= Computer-assisted proof =

Mathematical proof at least partially generated by computer

A computer-assisted proof is a mathematical proof that has been at least partially generated by computer.

Most computer-aided proofs to date have been implementations of large proofs-by-exhaustion of a mathematical theorem. The idea is to use a computer program to perform lengthy computations, and to provide a proof that the result of these computations implies the given theorem. In 1976, the four color theorem was the first major theorem to be verified using a computer program.

Attempts have also been made in the area of artificial intelligence research to create smaller, explicit, new proofs of mathematical theorems from the bottom up using automated reasoning techniques such as heuristic search. Such automated theorem provers have proved a number of new results and found new proofs for known theorems. Additionally, interactive proof assistants allow mathematicians to develop human-readable proofs which are nonetheless formally verified for correctness. Since these proofs are generally human-surveyable (albeit with difficulty, as with the proof of the Robbins conjecture) they do not share the controversial implications of computer-aided proofs-by-exhaustion.

== Methods ==
One method for using computers in mathematical proofs is by means of so-called validated numerics or rigorous numerics. This means computing numerically yet with mathematical rigour. One uses set-valued arithmetic and inclusion principle in order to ensure that the set-valued output of a numerical program encloses the solution of the original mathematical problem. This is done by controlling, enclosing and propagating round-off and truncation errors using for example interval arithmetic. More precisely, one reduces the computation to a sequence of elementary operations, say $(+, -, \times, /)$. In a computer, the result of each elementary operation is rounded off by the computer precision. However, one can construct an interval provided by upper and lower bounds on the result of an elementary operation. Then one proceeds by replacing numbers with intervals and performing elementary operations between such intervals of representable numbers.

== Philosophical objections ==
Computer-assisted proofs are the subject of some controversy in the mathematical world, with Thomas Tymoczko first to articulate objections. Those who adhere to Tymoczko's arguments believe that lengthy computer-assisted proofs are not, in some sense, 'real' mathematical proofs because they involve so many logical steps that they are not practically verifiable by human beings, and that mathematicians are effectively being asked to replace logical deduction from assumed axioms with trust in an empirical computational process, which is potentially affected by errors in the computer program, as well as defects in the runtime environment and hardware.

Other mathematicians believe that lengthy computer-assisted proofs should be regarded as calculations, rather than proofs: the proof algorithm itself should be proved valid, so that its use can then be regarded as a mere "verification". Arguments that computer-assisted proofs are subject to errors in their source programs, compilers, and hardware can be resolved by providing a formal proof of correctness for the computer program (an approach which was successfully applied to the four color theorem in 2005) as well as replicating the result using different programming languages, different compilers, and different computer hardware.

Another possible way of verifying computer-aided proofs is to generate their reasoning steps in a machine readable form, and then use a proof checker program to demonstrate their correctness. Since validating a given proof is much easier than finding a proof, the checker program is simpler than the original assistant program, and it is correspondingly easier to gain confidence into its correctness. However, this approach of using a computer program to prove the output of another program correct does not appeal to computer proof skeptics, who see it as adding another layer of complexity without addressing the perceived need for human understanding.

Another argument against computer-aided proofs is that they lack mathematical elegance, i.e. that they provide no insights or new and useful concepts. This is an argument which could be advanced against any lengthy proof by exhaustion whatsoever.

An additional philosophical issue raised by computer-aided proofs is whether they make mathematics into a quasi-empirical science, where the scientific method becomes more important than the application of pure reason in the area of abstract mathematical concepts. This directly relates to the argument within mathematics as to whether mathematics is based on ideas, or "merely" an exercise in formal symbol manipulation. It also raises the question whether, if according to the Platonist view, all possible mathematical objects in some sense "already exist", whether computer-aided mathematics is an observational science like astronomy, rather than an experimental one like physics or chemistry. This controversy within mathematics is occurring at the same time as questions are being asked in the physics community about whether twenty-first century theoretical physics is becoming too mathematical, and leaving behind its experimental roots.

The emerging field of experimental mathematics is confronting this debate head-on by focusing on numerical experiments as its main tool for mathematical exploration.

== Theorems proved with the help of computer programs ==
Inclusion in this list does not imply that a formal computer-checked proof exists, but rather, that a computer program has been involved in some way. See the main articles for details.

- Common fixed point problem, 1967
- Four color theorem, 1976
- Mitchell Feigenbaum's universality conjecture in non-linear dynamics. Proven by O. E. Lanford using rigorous computer arithmetic, 1982
- Connect Four, 1988 – a solved game
- Non-existence of a finite projective plane of order 10, 1989
- Double bubble conjecture, 1995
- Robbins conjecture, 1996
- Kepler conjecture, 1998 – the problem of optimal sphere packing in a box
- Lorenz attractor, 2002 – 14th of Smale's problems proved by Warwick Tucker using interval arithmetic
- 17-point case of the Happy Ending problem, 2006
- Kouril (between 2006 and 2016) computed several van der Waerden numbers using FPGA-based SAT-solver.
- NP-hardness of minimum-weight triangulation, 2008
- Ahmed (between 2009 and 2014) computed several van der Waerden numbers using DPLL algorithm-based stand-alone and distributed SAT-solvers. Ahmed first used cluster-distributed SAT-solvers to prove w(2; 3, 17) = 279 and w(2; 3, 18) = 312 in 2010.
- Optimal solutions for Rubik's Cube can be obtained in at most 20 face moves, 2010
- Minimum number of clues for a solvable Sudoku puzzle is 17, 2012
- In 2014 a special case of the Erdős discrepancy problem was solved using a SAT-solver. The full conjecture was later solved by Terence Tao without computer assistance.
- Boolean Pythagorean triples problem solved using 200 terabytes of data in May 2016.
- Applications to the Kolmogorov-Arnold-Moser theory
- Kazhdan's property (T) for the automorphism group of a free group of rank at least five
- Schur number five, the proof that S(5) = 161 was announced in 2017 by Marijn Heule and took up 2 petabytes of space
- Keller's conjecture in dimension 7 the only remaining case in 2020 with a 200 gigabyte proof
- The packing chromatic number of the infinite square grid is 15, by Subercaseaux and Heule in 2023 (See also: Hadwiger–Nelson problem for the chromatic number of the plane)

== See also ==
- Formal verification – Proving or disproving the correctness of certain intended algorithms
- Logic Theorist – 1956 computer program written by Allen Newell, Herbert A. Simon and Cliff Shaw
- Mathematical proof – Reasoning for mathematical statements
- Metamath – Formal language and associated computer program
- Model checking – Computer science field
- Seventeen or Bust – Integer with a specific property
- Symbolic computation – Scientific area at the interface between computer science and mathematics
- Validated numerics – Numerics including mathematically strict error evaluation
- List of mathematical discoveries by artificial intelligence
