= Eric Charles Milner =

Eric Charles Milner, FRSC (May 17, 1928 – July 20, 1997) was a mathematician who worked mainly in combinatorial set theory.

== Biography ==
Born into a South East London working-class family, Milner was sent to a Reading boarding school for the war but, hating it, ran away and roamed the streets of London. Eventually, another school was found for him; Milner attended King's College London starting in 1946, where he competed as a featherweight boxer. He graduated in 1949 as the best mathematics student in his year, and received a master's degree in 1950 under the supervision of Richard Rado and Charles Coulson. Partial deafness prevented him from joining the Navy, and instead, in 1951, he took a position with the Straits Trading Company in Singapore assaying tin. Soon thereafter he joined the mathematics faculty at the University of Malaya in Singapore, where Alexander Oppenheim and Richard K. Guy were already working. In 1958, Milner took a sabbatical at the University of Reading, and in 1961 he took a lecturership there and began his doctoral studies; he obtained a Ph.D. from the University of London in 1963. He joined his former Singapore colleagues Guy and Peter Lancaster as a professor at the University of Calgary in 1967, where he was head of the mathematics department from 1976 to 1980. In 1973, he became a Canadian citizen, and in 1976 he became a fellow of the Royal Society of Canada. In 1974 he was a Plenary Speaker of the International Congress of Mathematicians in Vancouver.

In 1954, while in Singapore, Milner married Esther Stella (Estelle) Lawton, whom he had known as a London student; they had four children who were Paul Milner, Mark Milner, Suzanne Milner, and Simon Milner. Estelle died of cancer in 1975, and in 1979 Milner married Elizabeth Forsyth Borthwick, with whom he had his son Robert Milner.

== Research ==
Milner's interest in set theory was sparked by visits of Paul Erdős to Singapore and by meeting András Hajnal while on sabbatical in Reading. He generalized Chen Chung Chang's ordinal partition theorem (expressed in the arrow notation for Ramsey theory) ω^{ω}→(ω^{ω},3)^{2} to ω^{ω}→(ω^{ω},k)^{2} for arbitrary finite k. He is also known for the Milner–Rado paradox. He has 15 joint papers with Paul Erdős.

== Selected works ==
- Milner, E. C.; Rado, R. (1965), "The pigeon-hole principle for ordinal numbers", Proc. London Math. Soc., Series 3, 15: 750–768, doi:10.1112/plms/s3-15.1.750, MR 0190003
- Milner, E. C.; Prikry, K. (1985), "Changing the depth of an ordered set by decomposition", Trans. Amer. Math. Soc., 290 (2): 773–785, doi:10.1090/s0002-9947-1985-0792827-8, MR 0792827
- Milner, E. C.; Prikry, K. (1986), "A partition theorem for triples", Proc. Amer. Math. Soc., 97 (3): 488–494, doi:10.1090/s0002-9939-1986-0840635-8, MR 0840635
