= Syndetic =

Syndetic may refer one of the following

- Syndetic set, in mathematics
- Syndetic coordination, in linguistics
