= Heule (surname) =

Heule is a surname. Notable people with the surname include:

- Christian Heule (born 1975), Swiss racing cyclist
- Marijn Heule (born 1979), Dutch computer scientist
- Michael Heule (born 2001), Swiss footballer
