= Ergodic Ramsey theory =

Mathematical subject

Ergodic Ramsey theory is a branch of mathematics where problems motivated by additive combinatorics are proven using ergodic theory.

== History ==
Ergodic Ramsey theory arose shortly after Endre Szemerédi's proof that a set of positive upper density contains arbitrarily long arithmetic progressions, when Hillel Furstenberg gave a new proof of this theorem using ergodic theory. It has since produced combinatorial results, some of which have yet to be obtained by other means, and has also given a deeper understanding of the structure of measure-preserving dynamical systems.

== Szemerédi's theorem ==
Szemerédi's theorem is a result in arithmetic combinatorics, concerning arithmetic progressions in subsets of the integers. In 1936, Erdős and Turán conjectured that every set of integers A with positive natural density contains a k-term arithmetic progression for every k. This conjecture, which became Szemerédi's theorem, generalizes the statement of van der Waerden's theorem. Hillel Furstenberg proved the theorem using ergodic principles in 1977.

== See also ==
- IP set
- Piecewise syndetic set
- Ramsey theory
- Syndetic set
- Thick set
