= Infeld–Van der Waerden symbols =

Matrices used for Lorentz group spinors

The Infeld–Van der Waerden symbols, sometimes called simply Van der Waerden symbols, are an invariant symbol associated to the Lorentz group used in quantum field theory. They are named after Leopold Infeld and Bartel Leendert van der Waerden.

The Infeld–Van der Waerden symbols are index notation for Clifford multiplication of covectors on left handed spinors giving a right-handed spinors or vice versa, i.e. they are off diagonal blocks of gamma matrices. The symbols are typically denoted in Van der Waerden notation as
$$\sigma^m{}_{\alpha\dot{\beta}}\quad\text{and}\quad\bar{\sigma}^{m\,\dot{\alpha}\beta}.$$
and so have one Lorentz index (m), one left-handed (undotted Greek), and one right-handed (dotted Greek) Weyl spinor index. They satisfy
$$\begin{align}
\sigma^m{}_{\alpha\dot{\beta}}\bar{\sigma}^{n\,\dot{\beta}\gamma} + \sigma^n{}_{\alpha\dot{\beta}}\bar{\sigma}^{m\,\dot{\beta}\gamma}
&= 2\delta_\alpha^\gamma g^{mn}, \quad \\
\sigma^m{}_{\alpha\dot{\beta}}\bar{\sigma}^{n\,\dot{\gamma}\alpha} + \sigma^n{}_{\alpha\dot{\beta}}\bar{\sigma}^{m\,\dot{\gamma}\alpha}
&= 2 \delta_{\dot \beta}^{\dot \gamma} g^{mn}.
\end{align}$$
They need not be constant, however, and can therefore be formulated on curved space time.

== Background ==
The existence of this invariant symbol follows from a result in the representation theory of the Lorentz group or more properly its Lie algebra. Labeling irreducible representations by $(j,\bar{\jmath})$, the spinor and its complex conjugate representations are the left and right fundamental representations

$(\tfrac{1}{2},0)$ and $(0,\tfrac{1}{2}),$

while the tangent vectors live in the vector representation

$$(\tfrac{1}{2},\tfrac{1}{2}).$$

The tensor product of one left and right fundamental representation is the vector representation,$(\tfrac{1}{2},0)\otimes(0,\tfrac{1}{2})=(\tfrac{1}{2},\tfrac{1}{2})$. A dual statement is that the tensor product of the vector, left, and right fundamental representations contains the trivial representation which is in fact generated by the construction of the Lie algebra representations through the Clifford algebra (see below)
$$(\tfrac{1}{2},0)\otimes(0,\tfrac{1}{2})\otimes(\tfrac{1}{2},\tfrac{1}{2})=(0,0)\oplus\cdots .$$

== Representations of the Clifford algebra ==
Consider the space of positive Weyl spinors $S$ of a Lorentzian vector space $(T,g)$ with dual $(T^\vee, g^\vee)$. Then the negative Weyl spinors can be identified with the vector space $\bar S^\vee$ of complex conjugate dual spinors. The Weyl spinors implement "two halves of a Clifford algebra representation" i.e. they come with a multiplication by covectors implemented as maps

$$\sigma:T^\vee \to \mathrm{Hom}(S, \bar S^\vee)$$

and

$$\bar\sigma: T^\vee \to \mathrm{Hom}(\bar S^\vee, S)$$

which we will call Infeld–Van der Waerden maps. Note that in a natural way we can also think of the maps as a sesquilinear map associating a vector to a left and righthand spinor

$$\sigma \in T \otimes  \bar S^\vee \otimes S^\vee \cong \mathrm{Hom}(\bar S \otimes S, T)$$

respectively $\bar \sigma \in T \otimes S \otimes \bar S \cong \mathrm{Hom}(S^\vee \otimes \bar S^\vee, T)$.

That the Infeld–Van der Waerden maps implement "two halves of a Clifford algebra representation" means that for covectors $a,b \in T^\vee$

$$\bar\sigma(a)\sigma(b) + \bar\sigma(b)\sigma(a) = 2g^\vee(a,b)1_{S}$$

resp.

$$\sigma(a)\bar\sigma(b) + \sigma(b)\bar\sigma(a) = 2g^\vee(a,b)1_{\bar S^\vee}$$,

so that if we define

$$\gamma = \begin{pmatrix}0 & \bar \sigma \\\sigma & 0 \end{pmatrix}:T^\vee \to \mathrm{End}(S\oplus \bar S^\vee)$$

then

$$\gamma(a)\gamma(b) + \gamma(b)\gamma(a) = 2g^\vee(a,b)1_{S \oplus \bar S^\vee}.$$

Therefore $\gamma$ extends to a proper Clifford algebra representation $\mathrm{Cl}(T^\vee, g^\vee) \to \mathrm{End}(S\oplus \bar S^\vee)$.

The Infeld–Van der Waerden maps are real (or hermitian) in the sense that the complex conjugate dual maps

$$\sigma^\dagger(a): S \mathop{\to}\limits^{\bar\ } \bar S \mathop{\longrightarrow}\limits^{\sigma^\vee(a)} S^\vee \mathop{\to}\limits^{\bar\ } \bar S^\vee$$

coincides (for a real covector $a$) :

$$\sigma(a) = \sigma(\bar a)^\dagger$$.

Likewise we have $\bar\sigma(a) = \bar\sigma(\bar a)^\dagger$.

Now the Infeld the Infeld–Van der Waerden symbols are the components of the maps $\bar\sigma$ and $\sigma$ with respect to bases of $T$ and $S$ with induced bases on $T^\vee$ and $\bar S^\vee$. Concretely, if T is the tangent space at a point O with local coordinates $x^m$ ($m = 0, \ldots, 3$) so that $\partial_m$ is a basis for $T$ and $dx^m$ is a basis for $T^\vee$, and $s_\alpha$ ($\alpha = 0,1$) is a basis for $S$, $s^\alpha$ is a dual basis for $S^\vee$ with complex conjugate dual basis $\bar s^{\dot\alpha}$ of $\bar S^\vee$, then

$$\sigma(dx^m)(s_\alpha) = \sigma^m_{\alpha\dot\beta}\bar s^{\dot \beta}$$
$$\bar\sigma(dx^m)(\bar s^{\dot\alpha}) = \bar\sigma^{m, \dot\alpha\beta}s_\beta$$

Using local frames of the (co)tangent bundle and a Weyl spinor bundle, the construction carries over to a differentiable manifold with a spinor bundle.

== Applications ==
The $\sigma$ symbols are of fundamental importance for calculations in quantum field theory in curved spacetime, and in supersymmetry. In the presence of a tetrad $e^\mu{}_m$ for "soldering" local Lorentz indices to tangent indices, the contracted version $\sigma^\mu{}_{\alpha\dot{\beta}}$ can also be thought of as a soldering form for building a tangent vector out of a pair of left and right Weyl spinors.

== Conventions ==
In flat Minkowski space, A standard component representation is in terms of the Pauli matrices, hence the $\sigma$ notation. In an orthonormal basis with a standard spin frame, the conventional components are
$$\begin{align}
\sigma^0{}_{\alpha\dot{\beta}} \ &\dot{=}\  \delta_{\alpha\dot{\beta}} \,, \\
\sigma^i{}_{\alpha\dot{\beta}} \ &\dot{=}\  (\sigma^i)_{\alpha\dot{\beta}} \,, \\
\bar{\sigma}^{0\,\dot{\alpha}\beta} \ &\dot{=}\  \delta^{\dot{\alpha}\beta} \,, \\
\bar{\sigma}^{i\,\dot{\alpha}\beta} \ &\dot{=}\  -(\sigma^i)^{\dot{\alpha}\beta} \,.
\end{align}$$
Note that these are the blocks of the gamma matrices in the Weyl Chiral basis convention. There are, however, many conventions.
