= Partition regularity =

In combinatorics, a branch of mathematics, partition regularity is one notion of largeness for a collection of sets.

Given a set $X$, a collection of subsets $\mathbb{S} \subset \mathcal{P}(X)$ is called partition regular if every set A in the collection has the property that, no matter how A is partitioned into finitely many subsets, at least one of the subsets will also belong to the collection. That is, for any $A \in \mathbb{S}$, and any finite partition $A = C_1 \cup C_2 \cup \cdots \cup C_n$, there exists an i ≤ n such that $C_i$ belongs to $\mathbb{S}$. Ramsey theory is sometimes characterized as the study of which collections $\mathbb{S}$ are partition regular.

== Examples ==
- The collection of all infinite subsets of an infinite set X is a prototypical example. In this case partition regularity asserts that every finite partition of an infinite set has an infinite cell (i.e. the infinite pigeonhole principle.)
- Sets with positive upper density in $\mathbb{N}$: the upper density $\overline{d}(A)$ of $A \subset \mathbb{N}$ is defined as $\overline{d}(A) = \limsup_{n \rightarrow \infty} \frac{| \{1,2,\ldots,n\} \cap A|}{n}.$ (Szemerédi's theorem)
- For any ultrafilter $\mathbb{U}$ on a set $X$, $\mathbb{U}$ is partition regular: for any $A \in \mathbb{U}$, if $A = C_1 \sqcup \cdots \sqcup C_n$, then exactly one $C_i \in \mathbb{U}$.
- Sets of recurrence: a set R of integers is called a set of recurrence if for any measure-preserving transformation $T$ of the probability space (Ω, β, μ) and $A \in \beta$ of positive measure there is a nonzero $n \in R$ so that $\mu(A \cap T^{n}A) > 0$.
- Call a subset of natural numbers a.p.-rich if it contains arbitrarily long arithmetic progressions. Then the collection of a.p.-rich subsets is partition regular (Van der Waerden, 1927).
- Let $[A]^n$ be the set of all n-subsets of $A \subset \mathbb{N}$. Let $\mathbb{S}^n = \bigcup^{ }_{A \subset \mathbb{N}} [A]^n$. For each n, $\mathbb{S}^n$ is partition regular. (Ramsey, 1930).
- For each infinite cardinal $\kappa$, the collection of stationary sets of $\kappa$ is partition regular. More is true: if $S$ is stationary and $S=\bigcup_{\alpha < \lambda} S_{\alpha}$ for some $\lambda < \kappa$, then some $S_{\alpha}$ is stationary.
- The collection of $\Delta$-sets: $A \subset \mathbb{N}$ is a $\Delta$-set if $A$ contains the set of differences $\{s_m - s_n : m,n \in \mathbb{N},\, n<m \}$ for some sequence $\langle s_n \rangle^{\infty}_{n=1}$.
- The set of barriers on $\mathbb{N}$: call a collection $\mathbb{B}$ of finite subsets of $\mathbb{N}$ a barrier if:
  - $\forall X,Y \in \mathbb{B}, X \not\subset Y$ and
  - for all infinite $I \subset \cup \mathbb{B}$, there is some $X \in \mathbb{B}$ such that the elements of X are the smallest elements of I; i.e. $X \subset I$ and $\forall i \in I \setminus X, \forall x \in X, x<i$.

This generalizes Ramsey's theorem, as each $[A]^n$ is a barrier. (Nash-Williams, 1965)

- Finite products of infinite trees (Halpern–Läuchli, 1966)
- Piecewise syndetic sets (Brown, 1968)
- Call a subset of natural numbers i.p.-rich if it contains arbitrarily large finite sets together with all their finite sums. Then the collection of i.p.-rich subsets is partition regular (Jon Folkman, Richard Rado, and J. Sanders, 1968).
- (m, p, c)-sets
- IP sets
- MT^{k} sets for each k, i.e. k-tuples of finite sums (Milliken–Taylor, 1975)
- Central sets; i.e. the members of any minimal idempotent in $\beta\mathbb{N}$, the Stone–Čech compactification of the integers. (Furstenberg, 1981, see also Hindman, Strauss, 1998)

== Diophantine equations ==
A Diophantine equation $P(\mathbf{x}) = 0$ is called partition regular if the collection of all infinite subsets of $\N$ containing a solution is partition regular. Rado's theorem characterises exactly which systems of linear Diophantine equations $\mathbf{A}\mathbf{x} = \mathbf{0}$ are partition regular. Much progress has been made recently on classifying nonlinear Diophantine equations.
