= Van der Waerden notation =

Notation used for Weyl spinors

In theoretical physics, Van der Waerden notation refers to the usage of two-component spinors (Weyl spinors) in four spacetime dimensions. This is standard in twistor theory and supersymmetry. It is named after Bartel Leendert van der Waerden.

== Dotted indices ==
Undotted indices (chiral indices)

Spinors with lower undotted indices have a left-handed chirality, and are called chiral indices.

$$\Sigma_\mathrm{left} =
\begin{pmatrix}
\psi_{\alpha}\\
0
\end{pmatrix}$$

Dotted indices (anti-chiral indices)

Spinors with raised dotted indices, plus an overbar on the symbol (not index), are right-handed, and called anti-chiral indices.

$$\Sigma_\mathrm{right} =
\begin{pmatrix}
0 \\
\bar{\chi}^{\dot{\alpha}}\\
\end{pmatrix}$$

Without the indices, i.e. "index free notation", an overbar is retained on right-handed spinor, since ambiguity arises between chirality when no index is indicated.

== Hatted indices ==
Indices which have hats are called Dirac indices, and are the set of dotted and undotted, or chiral and anti-chiral, indices. For example, if

$$\alpha = 1,2\,,\dot{\alpha} = \dot{1},\dot{2}$$

then a spinor in the chiral basis is represented as

$$\Sigma_\hat{\alpha} =
\begin{pmatrix}
\psi_{\alpha}\\
\bar{\chi}^{\dot{\alpha}}\\
\end{pmatrix}$$

where

$$\hat{\alpha}= (\alpha,\dot{\alpha}) = 1,2,\dot{1},\dot{2}$$

In this notation the Dirac adjoint (also called the Dirac conjugate) is

$$\Sigma^\hat{\alpha} =
\begin{pmatrix}
\chi^{\alpha} & \bar{\psi}_{\dot{\alpha}}
\end{pmatrix}$$

== See also ==
- Dirac equation
- Infeld–Van der Waerden symbols
- Lorentz transformation
- Pauli equation
- Ricci calculus
