= Theorem on friends and strangers =

Mathematical theorem

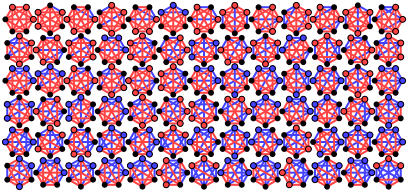
78 of the 156 possible friends-strangers graphs with 6 nodes. The other 78 can be obtained by reversing the red and blue colours of each graph. For each graph the red/blue nodes shows a sample triplet of mutual friends/strangers.

The theorem on friends and strangers is a mathematical theorem in an area of mathematics called Ramsey theory.

== Statement ==
Suppose a party has six people. Consider any two of them. They might be meeting for the first time—in which case we will call them mutual strangers; or they might have met before—in which case we will call them mutual acquaintances. The theorem says:

In any party of six people, at least three of them are (pairwise) mutual strangers or mutual acquaintances.

== Conversion to a graph-theoretic setting ==
A proof of the theorem requires nothing but a three-step logic. It is convenient to phrase the problem in graph-theoretic language.

Suppose a graph has 6 vertices and every pair of (distinct) vertices is joined by an edge. Such a graph is called a complete graph (because there cannot be any more edges). A complete graph on $n$ vertices is denoted by the symbol $K_n$.

Now take a $K_6$. It has 15 edges in all. Let the 6 vertices stand for the 6 people in our party. Let the edges be coloured red or blue depending on whether the two people represented by the vertices connected by the edge are mutual strangers or mutual acquaintances, respectively. The theorem now asserts:

No matter how you colour the 15 edges of a $K_6$ with red and blue, you cannot avoid having either a red triangle—that is, a triangle all of whose three sides are red, representing three pairs of mutual strangers—or a blue triangle, representing three pairs of mutual acquaintances. In other words, whatever colours you use, there will always be at least one monochromatic triangle ( that is, a triangle all of whose edges have the same color ).

== Proof ==
Choose any one vertex; call it P. There are five edges leaving P. They are each coloured red or blue. The pigeonhole principle says that at least three of them must be of the same colour; for if there are less than three of one colour, say red, then there are at least three that are blue.

Let A, B, C be the other ends of these three edges, and let these edges all be of the same colour, say blue. If any one of AB, BC, CA is blue, then that edge together with the two edges from P to the edge's endpoints forms a blue triangle. If none of AB, BC, CA is blue, then all three edges are red and we have a red triangle, namely, ABC.

== Ramsey's paper ==
The utter simplicity of this argument, which so powerfully produces a very interesting conclusion, is what makes the theorem appealing. In 1930, in a paper entitled 'On a Problem of Formal Logic,' Frank Ramsey proved a very general theorem (now known as Ramsey's theorem) of which this theorem is a simple case. This theorem of Ramsey forms the foundation of the area known as Ramsey theory in combinatorics.

== Boundaries to the theorem ==
A 2-colouring of K_{5} with no monochromatic K_{3}

The conclusion to the theorem does not hold if we replace the party of six people by a party of fewer than six. To show this, we give a coloring of K_{5} with red and blue that does not contain a triangle with all edges the same color. We draw K_{5} as a pentagon surrounding a star (a pentagram). We color the edges of the pentagon red and the edges of the star blue. Thus, 6 is the smallest number for which we can claim the conclusion of the theorem. In Ramsey theory, we write this fact as:

$$R(3,3: 2) = 6.$$
