= Bartel Leendert van der Waerden =

Dutch mathematician (1903–1996)

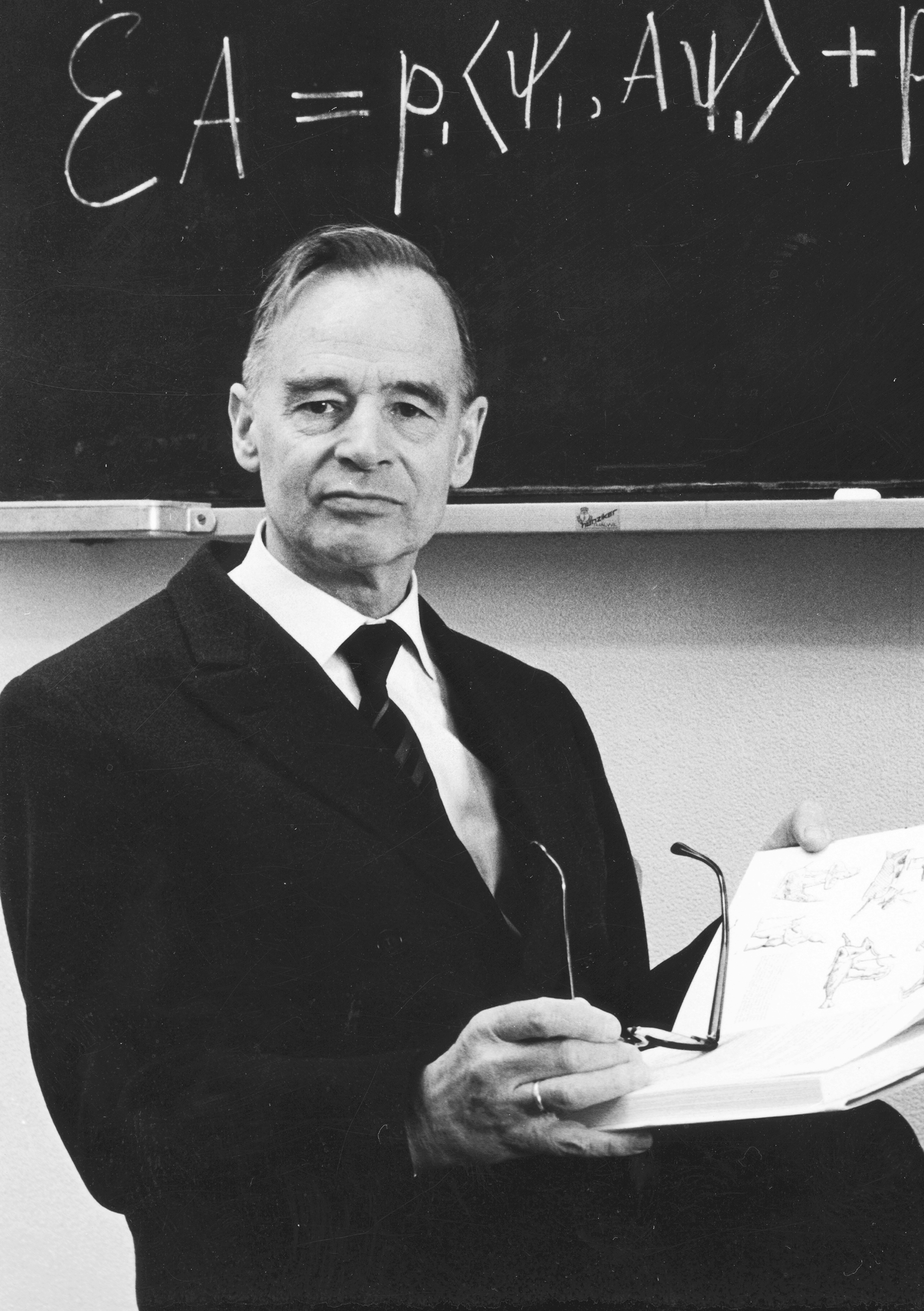
- Van der Waerden in 1980
- Born: 2 February 1903; Amsterdam, Netherlands
- Died: 12 January 1996 (aged 92); Zürich, Switzerland
- Education: University of Amsterdam; University of Göttingen
- Known for: Van der Waerden notation Van der Waerden number Van der Waerden's theorem Van der Waerden test Van der Waerden's conjecture Van der Waerden symbols Van der Waerden game
- Scientific career
- Fields: Mathematics
- Workplaces: University of Leipzig; University of Zurich; University of Groningen
- Doctoral advisor: Hendrik de Vries
- Doctoral students: Wei-Liang Chow; David van Dantzig; Jan van Deemter; Günther Frei; Guerino Mazzola; Herbert Seifert

Bartel Leendert van der Waerden (Dutch: [ˈbɑrtə(l) ˈleːndərt fɑn dər ˈʋaːrdə(n)]; 2 February 1903 – 12 January 1996) was a Dutch mathematician and historian of mathematics.

== Biography ==
=== Education and early career ===
Van der Waerden learned advanced mathematics at the University of Amsterdam and the University of Göttingen, from 1919 until 1926. He was much influenced by Emmy Noether at Göttingen, Germany. Amsterdam awarded him a Ph.D. for a thesis on algebraic geometry, supervised by Hendrick de Vries. Göttingen awarded him the habilitation in 1928. In that year, at the age of 25, he accepted a professorship at the University of Groningen.

At 27, Van der Waerden published his Moderne Algebra, an influential two-volume treatise on abstract algebra, still cited, and perhaps the first treatise to treat the subject as a comprehensive whole. This work systematized an ample body of research by Emmy Noether, David Hilbert, Richard Dedekind, and Emil Artin. In the following year, 1931, he was appointed professor at the University of Leipzig.

In July 1929, he married Camilla Juliana Anna Rellich, the sister of mathematician Franz Rellich. They had three children.

=== Nazi Germany ===
After the Nazis seized power, and through World War II, Van der Waerden remained at Leipzig, and passed up opportunities to leave Nazi Germany for Princeton and Utrecht. However, he was critical of the Nazis and refused to give up his Dutch nationality, both of which led to difficulties for him.

=== Postwar career ===
Following the war, Van der Waerden was repatriated to the Netherlands rather than returning to Leipzig (then under Soviet control), but struggled to find a position in the Dutch academic system, in part because his time in Germany made his politics suspect and in part due to Brouwer's opposition to Hilbert's school of mathematics. After a year visiting Johns Hopkins University and two years as a part-time professor, in 1950, Van der Waerden filled the chair in mathematics at the University of Amsterdam. In 1951, he moved to the University of Zurich, where he spent the rest of his career, supervising more than 40 Ph.D. students.

In 1949, Van der Waerden became member of the Royal Netherlands Academy of Arts and Sciences, in 1951 this was changed to a foreign membership. In 1973 he received the Pour le Mérite.

== Contributions ==
Van der Waerden is mainly remembered for his work on abstract algebra. He also wrote on algebraic geometry, topology, number theory, geometry, combinatorics, analysis, probability and statistics, and quantum mechanics (he and Heisenberg had been colleagues at Leipzig). In later years, he turned to the history of mathematics and science. His historical writings include Ontwakende wetenschap (1950), which was translated into English as Science Awakening (1954), Sources of Quantum Mechanics (1967), Geometry and Algebra in Ancient Civilizations (1983), and A History of Algebra (1985).

Van der Waerden has over 1000 academic descendants, most of them through three of his students, David van Dantzig (Ph.D. Groningen 1931), Herbert Seifert (Ph.D. Leipzig 1932), and Hans Richter (Ph.D. Leipzig 1936, co-advised by Paul Koebe).

== See also ==
- Van der Waerden notation
- Van der Waerden number
- Van der Waerden's conjecture
- Van der Waerden's theorem
- Van der Waerden test
