= IP set =

Set of natural numbers

In mathematics, an IP set is a set of natural numbers which contains all finite sums of some infinite set.

The finite sums of a set D of natural numbers are all those numbers that can be obtained by adding up the elements of some finite nonempty subset of D. The set of all finite sums over D is often denoted as FS(D). Slightly more generally, for a sequence of natural numbers (n_{i}), one can consider the set of finite sums FS((n_{i})), consisting of the sums of all finite length subsequences of (n_{i}).

A set A of natural numbers is an IP set if there exists an infinite set D such that FS(D) is a subset of A. Equivalently, one may require that A contains all finite sums FS((n_{i})) of a sequence (n_{i}).

Some authors give a slightly different definition of IP sets: They require that FS(D) equal A instead of just being a subset.

The term IP set was coined by Hillel Furstenberg and Benjamin Weiss to abbreviate "infinite-dimensional parallelepiped". Serendipitously, the abbreviation IP can also be expanded to "idempotent" (a set is an IP if and only if it is a member of an idempotent ultrafilter).

== Hindman's theorem ==
If $S$ is an IP set and $S = C_1 \cup C_2 \cup \cdots \cup C_n$, then at least one $C_i$ is an IP set. This is known as Hindman's theorem or the finite sums theorem. In different terms, Hindman's theorem states that the class of IP sets is partition regular.

Since the set of natural numbers itself is an IP set and partitions can also be seen as colorings, one can reformulate a special case of Hindman's theorem in more familiar terms: Suppose the natural numbers are "colored" with n different colors; each natural number gets one and only one color. Then there exists a color c and an infinite set D of natural numbers, all colored with c, such that every finite sum over D also has color c.

Hindman's theorem is named for mathematician Neil Hindman, who proved it in 1974. The Milliken–Taylor theorem is a common generalisation of Hindman's theorem and Ramsey's theorem.

== Semigroups ==
The definition of being IP has been extended from subsets of the special semigroup of natural numbers with addition to subsets of semigroups and partial semigroups in general. A variant of Hindman's theorem is true for arbitrary semigroups.

== See also ==
- Ergodic Ramsey theory
- Piecewise syndetic set
- Syndetic set
- Thick set
