= Erdős–Dushnik–Miller theorem =

In the mathematical theory of infinite graphs, the Erdős–Dushnik–Miller theorem is a form of Ramsey's theorem stating that every infinite graph contains either a countably infinite independent set, or a clique with the same cardinality as the whole graph.

The theorem was first published by Ben Dushnik and E. W. Miller (1941), in both the form stated above and an equivalent complementary form: every infinite graph contains either a countably infinite clique or an independent set with equal cardinality to the whole graph. In their paper, they credited Paul Erdős with assistance in its proof. They applied these results to the comparability graphs of partially ordered sets to show that each partial order contains either a countably infinite antichain or a chain of cardinality equal to the whole order, and that each partial order contains either a countably infinite chain or an antichain of cardinality equal to the whole order.

The same theorem can also be stated as a result in set theory, using the arrow notation of Erdős & Rado (1956), as $\kappa\rightarrow(\kappa,\alef_0)^2$. This means that, for every set $S$ of cardinality $\kappa$, and every partition of the ordered pairs of elements of $S$ into two subsets $P_1$ and $P_2$, there exists either a subset $S_1\subset S$ of cardinality $\kappa$ or a subset $S_2\subset S$ of cardinality $\alef_0$, such that all pairs of elements of $S_i$ belong to $P_i$. Here, $P_1$ can be interpreted as the edges of a graph having $S$ as its vertex set, in which $S_1$ (if it exists) is a clique of cardinality $\kappa$, and $S_2$ (if it exists) is a countably infinite independent set.

If $S$ is taken to be the cardinal number $\kappa$ itself, the theorem can be formulated in terms of ordinal numbers with the notation $\kappa\rightarrow(\kappa,\omega)^2$, meaning that $S_2$ (when it exists) has order type $\omega$. For uncountable regular cardinals $\kappa$ (and some other cardinals) this can be strengthened to $\kappa\rightarrow(\kappa,\omega+1)^2$; however, it is consistent that this strengthening does not hold for the cardinality of the continuum.

The Erdős–Dushnik–Miller theorem has been called the first "unbalanced" generalization of Ramsey's theorem, and Paul Erdős's first significant result in set theory.
