= Erdős–Rado theorem =

Theorem in combinatorial set theory extending Ramsey's theorem to uncountable sets

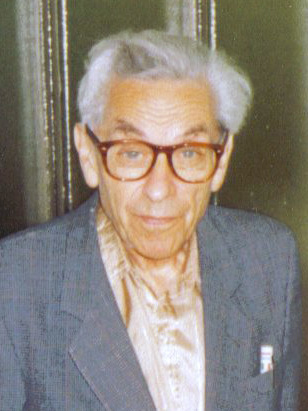
Paul Erdős at a student seminar in Budapest (fall 1992)

In partition calculus, part of combinatorial set theory, a branch of mathematics, the Erdős–Rado theorem is a basic result extending Ramsey's theorem to uncountable sets. It is named after Paul Erdős and Richard Rado. It is sometimes also attributed to Đuro Kurepa who proved it under the additional assumption of the generalised continuum hypothesis, and hence the result is sometimes also referred to as the Erdős–Rado–Kurepa theorem.

== Statement of the theorem ==
If r ≥ 0 is finite and κ is an infinite cardinal, then

$$\exp_r(\kappa)^+\longrightarrow(\kappa^+)^{r+1}_\kappa$$

where exp_{0}(κ) = κ and inductively exp_{r+1}(κ)=2^{exp_{r}(κ)}. This is sharp in the sense that exp_{r}(κ)^{+} cannot be replaced by exp_{r}(κ) on the left hand side.

The above partition symbol describes the following statement. If f is a coloring of the r+1-element subsets of a set of cardinality exp_{r}(κ)^{+}, in κ many colors, then there is a homogeneous set of cardinality κ^{+} (a set, all whose r+1-element subsets get the same f-value).
