= Richard Rado =

British mathematician (1906–1989)

Richard Rado FRS
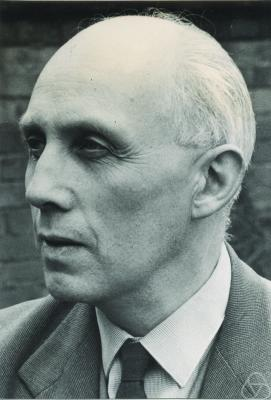
- Richard Rado, ca. 1967
- Born: 28 April 1906; Berlin, Germany
- Died: 23 December 1989 (aged 83); Reading, England
- Education: University of Cambridge; University of Berlin
- Known for: Erdős–Rado theorem Erdős–Ko–Rado theorem Milner–Rado paradox
- Awards: Senior Berwick Prize (1972), Fellow of the Royal Society
- Scientific career
- Fields: Mathematics
- Doctoral advisor: G. H. Hardy; Issai Schur
- Doctoral students: Gabriel Dirac; Eric Milner

Richard Rado FRS (28 April 1906 – 23 December 1989) was a German-born British mathematician whose research concerned combinatorics and graph theory. He was Jewish and left Germany to escape Nazi persecution. He earned two PhDs: in 1933 from the University of Berlin, and in 1935 from the University of Cambridge. He was interviewed in Berlin by Lord Cherwell for a scholarship given by the chemist Sir Robert Mond which provided financial support to study at Cambridge. After he was awarded the scholarship, Rado and his wife left for the UK in 1933. He was appointed Professor of Mathematics at the University of Reading in 1954 and remained there until he retired in 1971.

== Contributions ==
Rado made contributions in combinatorics and graph theory including 18 papers with Paul Erdős.

In graph theory, the Rado graph, a countably infinite graph containing all countably infinite graphs as induced subgraphs, is named after Rado. He rediscovered it in 1964 after previous works on the same graph by Wilhelm Ackermann, Erdős, and Alfréd Rényi.

In combinatorial set theory, the Erdős–Rado theorem extends Ramsey's theorem to infinite sets. It was published by Erdős and Rado in 1956. Rado's theorem is another Ramsey-theoretic result concerning systems of linear equations, proved by Rado in his thesis. The Milner–Rado paradox, also in set theory, states the existence of a partition of an ordinal into subsets of small order-type; it was published by Rado and E. C. Milner in 1965.

The Erdős–Ko–Rado theorem can be described either in terms of set systems or hypergraphs. It gives an upper bound on the number of sets in a family of finite sets, all the same size, that all intersect each other. Rado published it with Erdős and Chao Ko in 1961, but according to Erdős it was originally formulated in 1938.

In matroid theory, Rado proved a fundamental result of transversal theory by generalizing the Marriage Theorem for matchings between sets S and X to the case where X has a matroid structure and matchings must match to an independent set in the matroid on X.

The Klarner–Rado Sequence is named after Rado and David A. Klarner.

== Awards and honours ==
In 1972, Rado was awarded the Senior Berwick Prize.
