= Piecewise syndetic set =

In mathematics, piecewise syndeticity is a notion of largeness of subsets of the natural numbers.

A set $S \sub \mathbb{N}$ is called piecewise syndetic if there exists a finite subset G of $\mathbb{N}$ such that for every finite subset F of $\mathbb{N}$ there exists an $x \in \mathbb{N}$ such that

$$x+F \subset \bigcup_{n \in G} (S-n)$$

where $S-n = \{m \in \mathbb{N}: m+n \in S \}$. Equivalently, S is piecewise syndetic if there is a constant b such that there are arbitrarily long intervals of $\mathbb{N}$ where the gaps in S are bounded by b.

== Properties ==
- A set is piecewise syndetic if and only if it is the intersection of a syndetic set and a thick set.
- If S is piecewise syndetic then S contains arbitrarily long arithmetic progressions.
- A set S is piecewise syndetic if and only if there exists some ultrafilter U which contains S and U is in the smallest two-sided ideal of $\beta \mathbb{N}$, the Stone–Čech compactification of the natural numbers.
- Partition regularity: if $S$ is piecewise syndetic and $S = C_1 \cup C_2 \cup \dots \cup C_n$, then for some $i \leq n$, $C_i$ contains a piecewise syndetic set. (Brown, 1968)
- If A and B are subsets of $\mathbb{N}$ with positive upper Banach density, then $A+B=\{a+b : a \in A,\, b \in B\}$ is piecewise syndetic.

== Other notions of largeness ==
There are many alternative definitions of largeness that also usefully distinguish subsets of natural numbers:

- Cofiniteness
- IP set
- member of a nonprincipal ultrafilter
- positive upper density
- syndetic set
- thick set

== See also ==
- Ergodic Ramsey theory
