= Milner–Rado paradox =

In set theory, a branch of mathematics, the Milner–Rado paradox, found by Eric Charles Milner and Richard Rado (1965), states that every ordinal number $\alpha$ less than the successor $\kappa^{+}$ of a given cardinal number $\kappa$ can be written as the union of sets $X_1, X_2,...$ where $X_n$ is of order type at most $\kappa^{n}$ for $n$ a positive integer.

== Proof ==
The proof is by transfinite induction. Let $\alpha$ be a limit ordinal (the induction is trivial for successor ordinals), and for each $\beta<\alpha$, let $\{X^\beta_n\}_n$ be a partition of $\beta$ satisfying the requirements of the theorem.

Fix an increasing sequence $\{\beta_\gamma\}_{\gamma<\mathrm{cf}\,(\alpha)}$ cofinal in $\alpha$ with $\beta_0=0$.

Note $\mathrm{cf}\,(\alpha)\le\kappa$.

Define:

$$X^\alpha _0 = \{0\};\ \ X^\alpha_{n+1} = \bigcup_\gamma X^{\beta_{\gamma+1}}_n\setminus \beta_\gamma$$

Observe that:

$$\bigcup_{n>0}X^\alpha_n = \bigcup _n \bigcup _\gamma X^{\beta_{\gamma+1}}_n\setminus \beta_\gamma = \bigcup_\gamma \bigcup_n X^{\beta_{\gamma+1}}_n\setminus \beta_\gamma = \bigcup_\gamma \beta_{\gamma+1}\setminus \beta_\gamma = \alpha \setminus \beta_0$$

and so $\bigcup_nX^\alpha_n = \alpha$.

Let $\mathrm{ot}\,(A)$ be the order type of $A$. As for the order types, clearly $\mathrm{ot}(X^\alpha_0) = 1 = \kappa^0$.

Noting that the sets $\beta_{\gamma+1}\setminus\beta_\gamma$ form a consecutive sequence of ordinal intervals, and that each $X^{\beta_{\gamma+1}}_n\setminus\beta_\gamma$ is a tail segment of $X^{\beta_{\gamma+1}}_n$, then:

$$\mathrm{ot}(X^\alpha_{n+1}) = \sum_\gamma \mathrm{ot}(X^{\beta_{\gamma+1}}_n\setminus\beta_\gamma) \leq \sum_\gamma \kappa^n = \kappa^n \cdot \mathrm{cf}(\alpha) \leq \kappa^n\cdot\kappa = \kappa^{n+1}$$
