= Thick set =

Set of integers containing arbitrarily long intervals

In mathematics, a thick set is a set of integers that contains arbitrarily long intervals. That is, given a thick set $T$, for every $p \in \mathbb{N}$, there is some $n \in \mathbb{N}$ such that $\{n, n+1, n+2, ... , n+p \} \subset T$.

== Examples ==
Trivially $\mathbb{N}$ is a thick set. Other well-known sets that are thick include non-primes and non-squares. Thick sets can also be sparse, for example:

$\bigcup_{n \in \mathbb{N}} \{x:x=10^n +m:0\le m\le n\}.$

== Generalisations ==
The notion of a thick set can also be defined more generally for a semigroup, as follows. Given a semigroup $(S, \cdot)$ and $A \subseteq S$, $A$ is said to be thick if for any finite subset $F \subseteq S$, there exists $x \in S$ such that

$F \cdot x = \{ f \cdot x : f \in F \} \subseteq A.$

It can be verified that when the semigroup under consideration is the natural numbers $\mathbb{N}$ with the addition operation $+$, this definition is equivalent to the one given above.

== See also ==
- Cofinal (mathematics)
- Cofiniteness
- Ergodic Ramsey theory
- Piecewise syndetic set
- Syndetic set
