= Syndetic set =

Type of subset of the natural numbers

In mathematics, a syndetic set is a subset of the natural numbers having the property of "bounded gaps": that the sizes of the gaps in the sequence of natural numbers is bounded.

== Definition ==
A set $S \sub \mathbb{N}$ is called syndetic if for some finite subset $F$ of $\mathbb{N}$
$$\bigcup_{n \in F} (S-n) = \mathbb{N}$$
where $S-n = \{m \in \mathbb{N} : m+n \in S \}$. Thus syndetic sets have "bounded gaps"; for a syndetic set $S$, there is an integer $p=p(S)$ such that $[a, a+1, a+2, ... , a+p] \bigcap S \neq \emptyset$ for any $a \in \mathbb{N}$.

== See also ==
- Ergodic Ramsey theory
- Piecewise syndetic set
- Thick set
