= Van der Waerden number =

Integer in Ramsey theory

Van der Waerden's theorem states that for any positive integers r and k there exists a positive integer N such that if the integers {1, 2, ..., N} are colored, each with one of r different colors, then there are at least k integers in arithmetic progression all of the same color. The smallest such N is the van der Waerden number W(r, k).

== Tables of Van der Waerden numbers ==
There are two cases in which the van der Waerden number W(r, k) is easy to compute: first, when the number of colors r is equal to 1, one has W(1, k) = k for any integer k, since one color produces only trivial colorings RRRRR...RRR (for the single color denoted R). Second, when the length k of the forced arithmetic progression is 2, one has W(r, 2) = r + 1, since one may construct a coloring that avoids arithmetic progressions of length 2 by using each color at most once, but using any color twice creates a length-2 arithmetic progression. (For example, for r = 3, the longest coloring that avoids an arithmetic progression of length 2 is RGB.) There are only seven other van der Waerden numbers that are known exactly. The table below gives exact values and bounds for values of W(r, k); values are taken from Rabung and Lotts except where otherwise noted.

k\r	2 colors	3 colors	4 colors	5 colors	6 colors
3	9	27	76	>170	>225
4	35	293	>1,048	>2,254	>9,778
5	178	>2,173	>17,705	>98,741	>98,748
6	1,132	>11,191	>157,209	>786,740	>1,555,549
7	>3,703	>48,811	>2,284,751	>15,993,257	>111,952,799
8	>11,495	>238,400	>12,288,155	>86,017,085	>602,119,595
9	>41,265	>932,745	>139,847,085	>978,929,595	>6,852,507,165
10	>103,474	>4,173,724	>1,189,640,578	>8,327,484,046	>58,292,388,322
11	>193,941	>18,603,731	>3,464,368,083	>38,108,048,913	>419,188,538,043

Some lower bound colorings computed using SAT approach by Marijn J.H. Heule can be found on github project page.

Van der Waerden numbers with r ≥ 2 are bounded above by

$$W(r,k)\le 2^{2^{r^{2^{2^{k+9}}}}}$$

as proved by Gowers.

For a prime number p, the 2-color van der Waerden number is bounded below by

$$p\cdot2^p\le W(2,p+1),$$

as proved by Berlekamp.

One sometimes also writes w(r; k_{1}, k_{2}, ..., k_{r}) to mean the smallest number w such that any coloring of the integers {1, 2, ..., w} with r colors contains a progression of length k_{i} of color i, for some i. Such numbers are called off-diagonal van der Waerden numbers. Thus W(r, k) = w(r; k, k, ..., k). Following is a list of some known van der Waerden numbers:

Known van der Waerden numbers
w(r;k_{1}, k_{2}, …, k_{r})	Value	Reference
w(2; 3,3)	9	Chvátal
w(2; 3,4)	18	Chvátal
w(2; 3,5)	22	Chvátal
w(2; 3,6)	32	Chvátal
w(2; 3,7)	46	Chvátal
w(2; 3,8)	58	Beeler and O'Neil
w(2; 3,9)	77	Beeler and O'Neil
w(2; 3,10)	97	Beeler and O'Neil
w(2; 3,11)	114	Landman, Robertson, and Culver
w(2; 3,12)	135	Landman, Robertson, and Culver
w(2; 3,13)	160	Landman, Robertson, and Culver
w(2; 3,14)	186	Kouril
w(2; 3,15)	218	Kouril
w(2; 3,16)	238	Kouril
w(2; 3,17)	279	Ahmed
w(2; 3,18)	312	Ahmed
w(2; 3,19)	349	Ahmed, Kullmann, and Snevily
w(2; 3,20)	389	Ahmed, Kullmann, and Snevily (conjectured); Kouril (verified)
w(2; 3,21)	416	Ahmed, Kullmann, and Snevily (conjectured); Nahmias (proved; Lean-checked)
w(2; 4,4)	35	Chvátal
w(2; 4,5)	55	Chvátal
w(2; 4,6)	73	Beeler and O'Neil
w(2; 4,7)	109	Beeler
w(2; 4,8)	146	Kouril
w(2; 4,9)	309	Ahmed
w(2; 5,5)	178	Stevens and Shantaram
w(2; 5,6)	206	Kouril
w(2; 5,7)	260	Ahmed
w(2; 6,6)	1132	Kouril and Paul
w(3; 2, 3, 3)	14	Brown
w(3; 2, 3, 4)	21	Brown
w(3; 2, 3, 5)	32	Brown
w(3; 2, 3, 6)	40	Brown
w(3; 2, 3, 7)	55	Landman, Robertson, and Culver
w(3; 2, 3, 8)	72	Kouril
w(3; 2, 3, 9)	90	Ahmed
w(3; 2, 3, 10)	108	Ahmed
w(3; 2, 3, 11)	129	Ahmed
w(3; 2, 3, 12)	150	Ahmed
w(3; 2, 3, 13)	171	Ahmed
w(3; 2, 3, 14)	202	Kouril
w(3; 2, 4, 4)	40	Brown
w(3; 2, 4, 5)	71	Brown
w(3; 2, 4, 6)	83	Landman, Robertson, and Culver
w(3; 2, 4, 7)	119	Kouril
w(3; 2, 4, 8)	157	Kouril
w(3; 2, 5, 5)	180	Ahmed
w(3; 2, 5, 6)	246	Kouril
w(3; 3, 3, 3)	27	Chvátal
w(3; 3, 3, 4)	51	Beeler and O'Neil
w(3; 3, 3, 5)	80	Landman, Robertson, and Culver
w(3; 3, 3, 6)	107	Ahmed
w(3; 3, 4, 4)	89	Landman, Robertson, and Culver
w(3; 4, 4, 4)	293	Kouril
w(4; 2, 2, 3, 3)	17	Brown
w(4; 2, 2, 3, 4)	25	Brown
w(4; 2, 2, 3, 5)	43	Brown
w(4; 2, 2, 3, 6)	48	Landman, Robertson, and Culver
w(4; 2, 2, 3, 7)	65	Landman, Robertson, and Culver
w(4; 2, 2, 3, 8)	83	Ahmed
w(4; 2, 2, 3, 9)	99	Ahmed
w(4; 2, 2, 3, 10)	119	Ahmed
w(4; 2, 2, 3, 11)	141	Schweitzer
w(4; 2, 2, 3, 12)	163	Kouril
w(4; 2, 2, 4, 4)	53	Brown
w(4; 2, 2, 4, 5)	75	Ahmed
w(4; 2, 2, 4, 6)	93	Ahmed
w(4; 2, 2, 4, 7)	143	Kouril
w(4; 2, 3, 3, 3)	40	Brown
w(4; 2, 3, 3, 4)	60	Landman, Robertson, and Culver
w(4; 2, 3, 3, 5)	86	Ahmed
w(4; 2, 3, 3, 6)	115	Kouril
w(4; 3, 3, 3, 3)	76	Beeler and O'Neil
w(5; 2, 2, 2, 3, 3)	20	Landman, Robertson, and Culver
w(5; 2, 2, 2, 3, 4)	29	Ahmed
w(5; 2, 2, 2, 3, 5)	44	Ahmed
w(5; 2, 2, 2, 3, 6)	56	Ahmed
w(5; 2, 2, 2, 3, 7)	72	Ahmed
w(5; 2, 2, 2, 3, 8)	88	Ahmed
w(5; 2, 2, 2, 3, 9)	107	Kouril
w(5; 2, 2, 2, 4, 4)	54	Ahmed
w(5; 2, 2, 2, 4, 5)	79	Ahmed
w(5; 2, 2, 2, 4, 6)	101	Kouril
w(5; 2, 2, 3, 3, 3)	41	Landman, Robertson, and Culver
w(5; 2, 2, 3, 3, 4)	63	Ahmed
w(5; 2, 2, 3, 3, 5)	95	Kouril
w(6; 2, 2, 2, 2, 3, 3)	21	Ahmed
w(6; 2, 2, 2, 2, 3, 4)	33	Ahmed
w(6; 2, 2, 2, 2, 3, 5)	50	Ahmed
w(6; 2, 2, 2, 2, 3, 6)	60	Ahmed
w(6; 2, 2, 2, 2, 4, 4)	56	Ahmed
w(6; 2, 2, 2, 3, 3, 3)	42	Ahmed
w(7; 2, 2, 2, 2, 2, 3, 3)	24	Ahmed
w(7; 2, 2, 2, 2, 2, 3, 4)	36	Ahmed
w(7; 2, 2, 2, 2, 2, 3, 5)	55	Ahmed
w(7; 2, 2, 2, 2, 2, 3, 6)	65	Ahmed
w(7; 2, 2, 2, 2, 2, 4, 4)	66	Ahmed
w(7; 2, 2, 2, 2, 3, 3, 3)	45	Ahmed
w(8; 2, 2, 2, 2, 2, 2, 3, 3)	25	Ahmed
w(8; 2, 2, 2, 2, 2, 2, 3, 4)	40	Ahmed
w(8; 2, 2, 2, 2, 2, 2, 3, 5)	61	Ahmed
w(8; 2, 2, 2, 2, 2, 2, 3, 6)	71	Ahmed
w(8; 2, 2, 2, 2, 2, 2, 4, 4)	67	Ahmed
w(8; 2, 2, 2, 2, 2, 3, 3, 3)	49	Ahmed
w(9; 2, 2, 2, 2, 2, 2, 2, 3, 3)	28	Ahmed
w(9; 2, 2, 2, 2, 2, 2, 2, 3, 4)	42	Ahmed
w(9; 2, 2, 2, 2, 2, 2, 2, 3, 5)	65	Ahmed
w(9; 2, 2, 2, 2, 2, 2, 3, 3, 3)	52	Ahmed
w(10; 2, 2, 2, 2, 2, 2, 2, 2, 3, 3)	31	Ahmed
w(10; 2, 2, 2, 2, 2, 2, 2, 2, 3, 4)	45	Ahmed
w(10; 2, 2, 2, 2, 2, 2, 2, 2, 3, 5)	70	Ahmed
w(11; 2, 2, 2, 2, 2, 2, 2, 2, 2, 3, 3)	33	Ahmed
w(11; 2, 2, 2, 2, 2, 2, 2, 2, 2, 3, 4)	48	Ahmed
w(12; 2, 2, 2, 2, 2, 2, 2, 2, 2, 2, 3, 3)	35	Ahmed
w(12; 2, 2, 2, 2, 2, 2, 2, 2, 2, 2, 3, 4)	52	Ahmed
w(13; 2, 2, 2, 2, 2, 2, 2, 2, 2, 2, 2, 3, 3)	37	Ahmed
w(13; 2, 2, 2, 2, 2, 2, 2, 2, 2, 2, 2, 3, 4)	55	Ahmed
w(14; 2, 2, 2, 2, 2, 2, 2, 2, 2, 2, 2, 2, 3, 3)	39	Ahmed
w(15; 2, 2, 2, 2, 2, 2, 2, 2, 2, 2, 2, 2, 2, 3, 3)	42	Ahmed
w(16; 2, 2, 2, 2, 2, 2, 2, 2, 2, 2, 2, 2, 2, 2, 3, 3)	44	Ahmed
w(17; 2, 2, 2, 2, 2, 2, 2, 2, 2, 2, 2, 2, 2, 2, 2, 3, 3)	46	Ahmed
w(18; 2, 2, 2, 2, 2, 2, 2, 2, 2, 2, 2, 2, 2, 2, 2, 2, 3, 3)	48	Ahmed
w(19; 2, 2, 2, 2, 2, 2, 2, 2, 2, 2, 2, 2, 2, 2, 2, 2, 2, 3, 3)	50	Ahmed
w(20; 2, 2, 2, 2, 2, 2, 2, 2, 2, 2, 2, 2, 2, 2, 2, 2, 2, 2, 3, 3)	51	Ahmed
w(21; 2, 2, 2, 2, 2, 2, 2, 2, 2, 2, 2, 2, 2, 2, 2, 2, 2, 2, 2, 3, 3)	52	Karki

Van der Waerden numbers are primitive recursive, as proved by Shelah; in fact he proved that they are (at most) on the fifth level $\mathcal{E}^5$ of the Grzegorczyk hierarchy.

== See also ==
- Ramsey number
- Graph coloring
