= Structural Ramsey theory =

In mathematics, structural Ramsey theory is a categorical generalisation of Ramsey theory, rooted in the idea that many important results of Ramsey theory have "similar" logical structures. The key observation is noting that these Ramsey-type theorems can be expressed as the assertion that a certain category (or class of finite structures) has the Ramsey property (defined below).

Structural Ramsey theory began in the 1970s with the work of Nešetřil and Rödl, and is intimately connected to Fraïssé theory. It received some renewed interest in the mid-2000s due to the discovery of the Kechris–Pestov–Todorčević correspondence, which connected structural Ramsey theory to topological dynamics.

== History ==
Leeb is given credit for inventing the idea of a Ramsey property in the early 70s. The first publication of this idea appears to be Graham, Leeb and Rothschild's 1972 paper on the subject. Key development of these ideas was done by Nešetřil and Rödl in their series of 1977 and 1983 papers, including the famous Nešetřil–Rödl theorem. This result was reproved independently by Abramson and Harrington, and further generalised by Prömel. More recently, Mašulović and Solecki have done some pioneering work in the field.

== Motivation ==
This article will use the set theory convention that each natural number $n \in \mathbb{N}$ can be considered as the set of all natural numbers less than it: i.e. $n = \{ 0, 1, \ldots, n-1 \}$. For any set $A$, an $r$-colouring of $A$ is an assignment of one of $r$ labels to each element of $A$. This can be represented as a function $\Delta: A \to r$ mapping each element to its label in $r = \{ 0, 1, \ldots, r-1 \}$ (which this article will use), or equivalently as a partition of $A = A_{0} \sqcup \cdots \sqcup A_{r-1}$ into $r$ pieces.

Here are some of the classic results of Ramsey theory:

- (Finite) Ramsey's theorem: for every $k \leq m, r \in \mathbb{N}$, there exists $n \in \mathbb{N}$ such that for every $r$-colouring $\Delta: [n]^{(k)} \to r$ of all the $k$-element subsets of $n = \{ 0, 1, \ldots, n-1 \}$, there exists a subset $A \subseteq n$, with $|A|=m$, such that $[A]^{(k)}$ is $\Delta$-monochromatic.
- (Finite) van der Waerden's theorem: for every $m, r \in \mathbb{N}$, there exists $n \in \mathbb{N}$ such that for every $r$-colouring $\Delta: n \to r$ of $n$, there exists a $\Delta$-monochromatic arithmetic progression $\{ a, a+d, a+2d, \ldots, a+(m-1)d \} \subseteq n$ of length $m$.
- Graham–Rothschild theorem: fix a finite alphabet $L = \{ a_0, a_1, \ldots, a_{d-1} \}$. A $k$-parameter word of length $n$ over $L$ is an element $w \in (L \cup \{ x_0, x_1, \ldots, x_{k-1} \})^n$, such that all of the $x_i$ appear, and their first appearances are in increasing order. The set of all $k$-parameter words of length $n$ over $L$ is denoted by $\textstyle [L]\binom{n}{k}$. Given $\textstyle w \in [L]\binom{n}{m}$ and $\textstyle v \in [L]\binom{m}{k}$, we form their composition $\textstyle w \circ v \in [L]\binom{n}{k}$ by replacing every occurrence of $x_i$ in $w$ with the $i$th entry of $v$.
  Then, the Graham–Rothschild theorem states that for every $k \leq m, r \in \mathbb{N}$, there exists $n \in \mathbb{N}$ such that for every $r$-colouring $\textstyle \Delta: [L]\binom{n}{k} \to r$ of all the $k$-parameter words of length $n$, there exists $\textstyle w \in [L]\binom{n}{m}$, such that $\textstyle w \circ [L]\binom{m}{k} = \{ w \circ v: v \in [L]\binom{m}{k} \}$ (i.e. all the $k$-parameter subwords of $w$) is $\Delta$-monochromatic.
- (Finite) Folkman's theorem: for every $m, r \in \mathbb{N}$, there exists $n \in \mathbb{N}$ such that for every $r$-colouring $\Delta: n \to r$ of $n$, there exists a subset $A \subseteq n$, with $|A|=m$, such that $\textstyle \big( \sum_{k \in A} k \big) < n$, and $\textstyle \operatorname{FS}(A) = \{ \sum_{k \in B} k : B \in \mathcal{P}(A) \setminus \varnothing \}$ is $\Delta$-monochromatic.

These "Ramsey-type" theorems all have a similar idea: we fix two integers $k$ and $m$, and a set of colours $r$. Then, we want to show there is some $n$ large enough, such that for every $r$-colouring of the "substructures" of size $k$ inside $n$, we can find a suitable "structure" $A$ inside $n$, of size $m$, such that all the "substructures" $B$ of $A$ with size $k$ have the same colour.

What types of structures are allowed depends on the theorem in question, and this turns out to be virtually the only difference between them. This idea of a "Ramsey-type theorem" leads itself to the more precise notion of the Ramsey property (below).

== The Ramsey property ==
Let $\mathbf{C}$ be a category. $\mathbf{C}$ has the Ramsey property if for every natural number $r$, and all objects $A, B$ in $\mathbf{C}$, there exists another object $D$ in $\mathbf{C}$, such that for every $r$-colouring $\Delta: \operatorname{Hom}(A,D) \to r$, there exists a morphism $f: B \to D$ which is $\Delta$-monochromatic, i.e. the set

$$f \circ \operatorname{Hom}(A,B) = \big\{ f \circ g: g \in \operatorname{Hom}(A,B) \big\}$$

is $\Delta$-monochromatic.

Often, $\mathbf{C}$ is taken to be a class of finite $\mathcal{L}$-structures over some fixed language $\mathcal{L}$, with embeddings as morphisms. In this case, instead of colouring morphisms, one can think of colouring "copies" of $A$ in $D$, and then finding a copy of $B$ in $D$, such that all copies of $A$ in this copy of $B$ are monochromatic. This may lend itself more intuitively to the earlier idea of a "Ramsey-type theorem".

There is also a notion of a dual Ramsey property; $\mathbf{C}$ has the dual Ramsey property if its dual category $\mathbf{C}^\mathrm{op}$ has the Ramsey property as above. More concretely, $\mathbf{C}$ has the dual Ramsey property if for every natural number $r$, and all objects $A, B$ in $\mathbf{C}$, there exists another object $D$ in $\mathbf{C}$, such that for every $r$-colouring $\Delta: \operatorname{Hom}(D,A) \to r$, there exists a morphism $f: D \to B$ for which $\operatorname{Hom}(B,A) \circ f$ is $\Delta$-monochromatic.

== Examples ==
- Ramsey's theorem: the class of all finite chains, with order-preserving maps as morphisms, has the Ramsey property.
- van der Waerden's theorem: in the category whose objects are finite ordinals, and whose morphisms are affine maps $x \mapsto a + dx$ for $a,d \in \mathbb{N}$, $d \neq 0$, the Ramsey property holds for $A=1$.
- Hales–Jewett theorem: let $L$ be a finite alphabet, and for each $k \in \mathbb{N}$, let $X_k = \{ x_0, \ldots, x_{k-1} \}$ be a set of $k$ variables. Let $\mathbf{GR}$ be the category whose objects are $A_k = L \cup X_k$ for each $k \in \mathbb{N}$, and whose morphisms $A_n \to A_k$, for $n \geq k$, are functions $f: X_n \to A_k$ which are rigid and surjective on $X_k \subseteq A_k = \operatorname{codom}f$. Then, $\mathbf{GR}$ has the dual Ramsey property for $A = A_0$ (and $B = A_1$, depending on the formulation).
- Graham–Rothschild theorem: the category $\mathbf{GR}$ defined above has the dual Ramsey property.

== The Kechris–Pestov–Todorčević correspondence ==
In 2005, Kechris, Pestov and Todorčević discovered the following correspondence (hereafter called the KPT correspondence) between structural Ramsey theory, Fraïssé theory, and ideas from topological dynamics.

Let $G$ be a topological group. For a topological space $X$, a $G$-flow (denoted $G \curvearrowright X$) is a continuous action of $G$ on $X$. We say that $G$ is extremely amenable if any $G$-flow $G \curvearrowright X$ on a compact space $X$ admits a fixed point $x \in X$, i.e. the stabiliser of $x$ is $G$ itself.

For a Fraïssé structure $\mathbf{F}$, its automorphism group $\operatorname{Aut}(\mathbf{F})$ can be considered a topological group, given the topology of pointwise convergence, or equivalently, the subspace topology induced on $\operatorname{Aut}(\mathbf{F})$ by the space $\mathbf{F}^\mathbf{F} = \{ f: \mathbf{F} \to \mathbf{F} \}$ with the product topology. The following theorem illustrates the KPT correspondence:

Theorem (KPT). For a Fraïssé structure $\mathbf{F}$, the following are equivalent:

1. The group $\operatorname{Aut}(\mathbf{F})$ of automorphisms of $\mathbf{F}$ is extremely amenable.
2. The class $\operatorname{Age}(\mathbf{F})$ has the Ramsey property.

== See also ==
- Ramsey theory
- Fraïssé's theorem
- Age (model theory)
