= Fan Chung =

American mathematician

- 金芳蓉
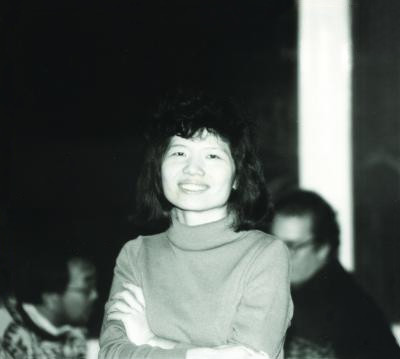
- Fan Chung in 1987
- Born: October 9, 1949 (age 77); Kaohsiung, Taiwan
- Education: National Taiwan University (BS); University of Pennsylvania (MS, PhD)
- Known for: Spectral graph theory extremal graph theory Random graphs
- Spouse: Ronald Graham (m. 1983; died 2020)
- Scientific career
- Fields: Mathematics, combinatorics
- Workplaces: University of Pennsylvania; University of California, San Diego
- Thesis: Ramsey Numbers in Multi-Colors and combinatorial designs (1974)
- Doctoral advisor: Herbert Wilf
- Doctoral students: Steve Butler

Fan-Rong King Chung Graham (Chinese: 金芳蓉; pinyin: Jīn Fāngróng; born October 9, 1949), known professionally as Fan Chung, is a Taiwanese-American mathematician who works mainly in the areas of spectral graph theory, extremal graph theory and random graphs, in particular in generalizing the Erdős–Rényi model for graphs with general degree distribution (including power-law graphs in the study of large information networks).

Since 1998, Chung has been the Paul Erdős Professor in Combinatorics at the University of California, San Diego (UCSD). She received her doctorate from the University of Pennsylvania in 1974, under the direction of Herbert Wilf. After working at Bell Laboratories and Bellcore for nineteen years, she joined the faculty of the University of Pennsylvania as the first female tenured professor in mathematics. She serves on the editorial boards of more than a dozen international journals. Since 2003 she has been the editor-in-chief of Internet Mathematics. She has been invited to give lectures at many conferences, including the International Congress of Mathematicians in 1994 and a plenary lecture on the mathematics of PageRank at the 2008 Annual meeting of the American Mathematical Society. She was selected to be a Noether Lecturer in 2009. In 2024, she was elected to the United States National Academy of Sciences.

== Biography ==
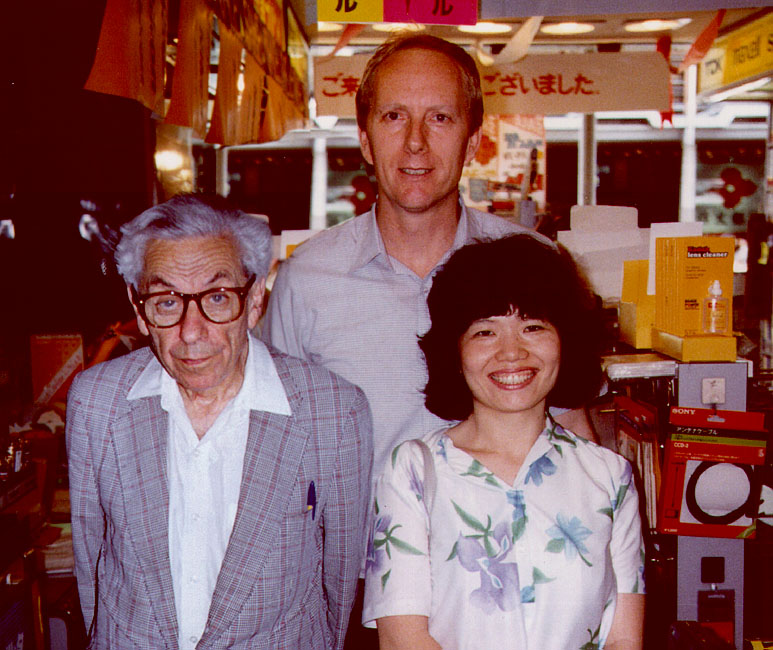
Fan Chung, her husband Ronald Graham, and Paul Erdős, Japan, 1986

Fan Chung was born on October 9, 1949, in Kaohsiung, Taiwan. Under the influence of her father, an engineer, she became interested in mathematics, especially in the area of combinatorics in high school in Kaohsiung. After high school, Chung entered the National Taiwan University (NTU) to start her career in mathematics formally. While Chung was an undergraduate, she was surrounded by many female mathematicians, and this helped encourage her to pursue and study mathematics.

After graduating from NTU with a B.S. in mathematics, Chung went on to the University of Pennsylvania to pursue a career in mathematics. There she obtained the highest score in the qualifying exam by a wide margin, catching the attention of Herbert Wilf, who would eventually become her doctoral advisor. Wilf suggested Ramsey theory as a subject Chung could work on. During a single week studying material Chung had come up with new proofs for established results in the field. Wilf said: "My eyes were bulging. I was very excited. I asked her to go to the blackboard and show me. What she wrote was incredible! In just one week, from a cold start, she had a major result in Ramsey theory. I told her she had just done two-thirds of a doctoral dissertation."

Chung earned a M.S. in 1972 and a Ph.D. in 1974. By this time, she was married and had already given birth to her first child. After receiving her Ph.D., she began working for the Mathematical Foundations of Computing Department at Bell Laboratories in Murray Hill, New Jersey. The position at Bell Laboratories was an opportunity to work with other mathematicians. She has published many mathematical papers that are considered impressive, and published many joint papers with Ronald Graham.

=== Bell Laboratories ===
In 1974, Fan Chung graduated from the University of Pennsylvania and became a Member of Technical Staff working for the Mathematical Foundations of Computing Department at Bell Laboratories in Murray Hill, New Jersey. She worked under Henry Pollak. During this time, Chung collaborated with many leading mathematicians who worked for Bell Laboratories.

In 1975, Chung published her first joint paper with Graham, On multicolor Ramsey numbers for complete bipartite graphs, which was published in the Journal of Combinatorial Theory (Series B).

In 1983, the Bell Telephone Company was split up. Since Pollak joined and became head of a research unit within a new company, he asked Chung to become Research Manager. She supervised many mathematicians in the unit.

Usually with positions in management you obtain more influence and you certainly have more power to make decisions. But I do not want people to respect me because of that power. I'd rather win their admiration because of the mathematics I'm doing.

— Fan Chung, in Donald J. Albers, Making Connections: A Profile of Fan Chung, Math Horizons, September 1995, 14–18

In 1990, she was one of the first to receive a Bellcore university fellowship, a sabbatical she spent at Harvard university.

=== Later career ===
After twenty years of work at Bell Laboratories and Bellcore, Chung decided to go back to the University of Pennsylvania to become a professor of mathematics. In 1998, she was named Distinguished Professor of Mathematics at the University of California, San Diego.

Beyond her contributions to graph theory, Chung has used her knowledge to connect different fields of science. As she wrote in "Graph Theory in the Information Age",

“In the past decade, graph theory has gone through a remarkable shift and a profound transformation. The change is in large part due to the humongous amount of information that we are confronted with. A main way to sort through massive data sets is to build and examine the network formed by interrelations. For example, Google’s successful Web search algorithms are based on the WWW graph, which contains all Web pages as vertices and hyperlinks as edges. There are all sorts of information networks, such as biological networks built from biological databases and social networks formed by email, phone calls, instant messaging, etc., as well as various types of physical networks. Of particular interest to mathematicians is the collaboration graph, which is based on the data from Mathematical Reviews. In the collaboration graph, every mathematician is a vertex, and two mathematicians who wrote a joint paper are connected.”

Chung's life was profiled in the 2017 documentary film Girls who fell in love with Math.

In 2012, she became a fellow of the American Mathematical Society.

Chung was an American Mathematical Society (AMS) Council member at large.

=== Personal life ===
Chung has two children; the first child was born during her graduate studies from her first marriage.

Fan Chung's first marriage ended in divorce in 1982. However, when she worked at Bell Laboratories, she met Ronald Graham. During that time, they became close friends and published many joint papers in graph theory, eventually marrying in 1983. She was married to him until his death in 2020.

In Paul Hoffman's book The Man Who Loved Only Numbers, regarding her marriage with Graham, Chung said:

Many mathematicians would hate to marry someone in the profession. They fear their relationship would be too competitive. In our case, not only are we both mathematicians, we both do work in the same areas. So we can understand and appreciate what the other is working on, and we can work on things together and sometimes make good progress.

Both Chung and Graham were close friends of the mathematician Paul Erdős, and have both published papers with him – 13 in her case; thus, both have Erdős numbers of one. In 1998, Graham and Chung co-wrote the book Erdős on Graphs.

== Research ==
Chung has published more than 200 research papers and three books:

- Erdős on Graphs: His Legacy of Unsolved Problems (with Ron Graham), A K Peters, Ltd., 1998, ISBN 1-56881-079-2
- Spectral Graph Theory (CBMS Regional Conference Series in Mathematics, No. 92), American Mathematical Society, 1997, ISBN 0-8218-0315-8
- Complex Graphs and Networks (CBMS Regional Conference Series in Mathematics, No. 107) (with Linyuan Lu), American Mathematical Society, 2006, ISBN 0-8218-3657-9

=== Spectral graph theory ===
Among Fan Chung's publications, her contributions to spectral graph theory are important to this area of graph theory. From the first publications about undirected graphs to recent publications about directed graphs, Fan Chung creates the solid base in the spectral graph theory to the future graph theorist.

Spectral graph theory, as one of the most important theories in graph theory, combines the algebra and graph perfectly. Historically, algebraic methods treat many types of graphs efficiently. Her work initiated a geometric approach to spectral graph theory with connections to differential geometry. According to the biography Fan Rong K Chung Graham, "Spectral graph theory studies how the spectrum of the Laplacian of a graph is related to its combinatorial properties.".

In 1997, the American Mathematical Society published Chung's book Spectral graph theory. This book became a standard textbook at many universities for studying spectral graph theory. Fan Chung's study in spectral graph theory brings this “algebraic connectivity” of graphs into a new and higher level.

=== Network science ===
Chung's work in random graph models shed new light on the field of network science. Many real-world large information networks (such as Internet Graphs, Call Graphs, and collaboration graphs) have been observed to be well approximated by a power law distribution. Chung's work in the Chung-Lu model, pioneered the theory of treating random graphs with arbitrary degree distributions, including the power law graphs. Her work provides a solid framework for quantitative and rigorous analysis for modeling and analyzing large complex networks. It also often serves as a popular benchmark for comparing new graph models in network science.

In 2006, the American Mathematical Society and the Conference Board of the Mathematical Sciences co-published Fan Chung and Linyuan Lu's book Complex Graphs and Networks. The book gave a well-structured exposition for using combinatorial, probabilistic, spectral methods as well as other new and improved tools to analyze real-world large information networks.

=== Quasi-random graphs ===
Fan Chung, together with Ronald Graham and Richard Wilson, introduced a strong notion of equivalence among graph properties through the control of error bounds and developed the theory of quasi-random graphs. In a series of research papers (with several coauthors), she showed that a large family of graph properties is equivalent in the sense that if a graph satisfies any one of the properties, it must satisfy all of them. The set of equivalent quasi-random properties includes a surprisingly diverse collection of properties, and therefore provides efficient methods for validating graph properties. Many (but not all) random graph properties are quasi-random. The notion of quasi-randomness has been extended to many other combinatorial structures, such as sequences, tournaments, hypergraphs and graph limits. In general, the theory of quasi-randomness gives a rigorous approach to 'random-like' or 'pseudorandom' alternatives.

=== Extremal graph theory ===
A basic question in extremal graph theory is to find unavoidable patterns and structures in graphs with given density or distribution. A complementary problem is to find a smallest graph which contains every member of a given family of graphs as subgraphs. In a series of works with Paul Erdős, Chung determined the sizes and structures of unavoidable graphs and hypergraphs. With several coauthors, she also derived many results on universal graphs. Her contributions in these areas of extremal graph theory have many applications in parallel computations.

=== Graph Pebbling ===
The problem of graph pebbling, first posited by Lagarias and Saks, came across to Chung through Paul Erdős. In a 2016 interview with Anthony Bonato, Professor of Mathematics at Toronto Metropolitan University, Chung describes this exchange:

I first heard that problem from Paul; it wasn't his problem, but he told me about it. I liked hypercubes so I worked on it and wrote a paper.

In 1989, Chung introduced the concept of graph pebbling into the literature and defined the pebbling number, π(G). Her publication includes a concluding conjecture referred to as the Graham's pebbling conjecture, a credit to Ron Graham, whom she discussed the topic in casual conversation. Her work on graph pebbling served as the basis for a greater following in the area that began the following summer, when fellow mathematician, Joseph A. Gallian, Ph.D., requested the use of her papers on the topic for use in his Research Experience for Undergraduates (REU) program.

== Awards and honors ==
- Allendoerfer Award of Mathematical Association of America (1990)
- Invited address, International Congress of Mathematicians (1994)
- Noether Lecturer, Association for Women in Mathematics (2009)
- Fellow, American Academy of Arts and Sciences (1998)
- Fellow, American Mathematics Society (2013)
- Fellow, Society for Industrial and Applied Mathematics (2015)
- Academician, Academia Sinica (2016)
- Euler Medal of Institute of Combinatorics and its Applications (2017)
- Honorary Doctorate, University of Waterloo (2017)
- She is included in a deck of playing cards featuring notable women mathematicians published by the Association of Women in Mathematics.
- Elected to the United States National Academy of Sciences (2024)
- Revelle Medal for "sustained, distinguished and extraordinary service to [UCSD's] campus" (2024)

== Sources ==
- Notable Women in Mathematics, a Biographical Dictionary, edited by Charlene Morrow and Teri Perl, Greenwood Press, 1998, pp. 29–34.
