= Primefree sequence =

Sequence of integer free of any prime number

In mathematics, a primefree sequence is a sequence of integers that does not contain any prime numbers. More specifically, it usually means a sequence defined by the same recurrence relation as the Fibonacci numbers, but with different initial conditions causing all members of the sequence to be composite numbers that do not all have a common divisor. To put it algebraically, a sequence of this type is defined by an appropriate choice of two composite numbers a_{1} and a_{2}, such that the greatest common divisor $\mathrm{gcd}(a_1,a_2)$ is equal to 1, and such that for $n>2$ there are no primes in the sequence of numbers calculated from the formula

$$a_n=a_{n-1}+a_{n-2}$$.

The first primefree sequence of this type was published by Ronald Graham in 1964.

== Wilf's sequence ==
A primefree sequence found by Herbert Wilf has initial terms

$a_1 = 20615674205555510, a_2 = 3794765361567513$ (sequence A083216 in the OEIS)

The proof that every term of this sequence is composite relies on the periodicity of Fibonacci-like number sequences modulo the members of a finite set of primes. For each prime $p$, the positions in the sequence where the numbers are divisible by $p$ repeat in a periodic pattern, and different primes in the set have overlapping patterns that result in a covering set for the whole sequence.

== Nontriviality ==
The requirement that the initial terms of a primefree sequence be coprime is necessary for the question to be non-trivial. If the initial terms share a prime factor $p$ (e.g., set $a_1=xp$ and $a_2=yp$ for some $x$ and $y$ both greater than 1), due to the distributive property of multiplication $a_3=(x+y)p$ and more generally all subsequent values in the sequence will be multiples of $p$. In this case, all the numbers in the sequence will be composite, but for a trivial reason.

The order of the initial terms is also important. In Paul Hoffman's biography of Paul Erdős, The man who loved only numbers, the Wilf sequence is cited but with the initial terms switched. The resulting sequence appears primefree for the first hundred terms or so, but term 138 is the 45-digit prime $439351292910452432574786963588089477522344721$.

== Other sequences ==
Several other primefree sequences are known:

$a_1 = 331635635998274737472200656430763, a_2 = 1510028911088401971189590305498785$ (sequence A083104 in the OEIS; Graham 1964),
$a_1 = 62638280004239857, a_2 = 49463435743205655$ (sequence A083105 in the OEIS; Knuth 1990), and
$a_1 = 407389224418, a_2 = 76343678551$ (sequence A082411 in the OEIS; Nicol 1999).

The sequence of this type with the smallest known initial terms has

$a_1 = 106276436867, a_2 = 35256392432$ (sequence A221286 in the OEIS; Vsemirnov 2004).
