= Alfred W. Hales =

American mathematician

- Born: Alfred Washington Hales; November 30, 1938 (age 87); Pasadena, California, U.S.
- Education: California Institute of Technology
- Relatives: R. Stanton Hales (brother)
- Awards: George Pólya Prize (1963); Fellow of the AAAS (2009); Fellow of the American Mathematical Society (2013)
- Scientific career
- Fields: Mathematics
- Workplaces: University of California, Los Angeles; Institute for Defense Analyses
- Thesis: On the Nonexistence of Free Complete Boolean Algebras (1962)
- Doctoral advisor: Robert P. Dilworth

Alfred Washington Hales (born November 30, 1938) is an American mathematician, a professor emeritus of mathematics at the University of California, Los Angeles, and one of the namesakes of the Hales–Jewett theorem. He was born in Pasadena, California, and is the older brother of R. Stanton Hales.

== Professional career ==
As an undergraduate, Hales was a two-time Putnam Fellow for the California Institute of Technology, in 1958 and 1959. Hales stayed at Caltech for his graduate studies, earning his Ph.D. in 1962 under the supervision of Robert P. Dilworth. He is the former chair of the mathematics department at UCLA, and in 2010 became chair of the board of trustees of the Institute for Pure and Applied Mathematics at UCLA. From 1992 to 2003, he was director of the IDA Center for Communications Research in La Jolla, California.

== Contributions ==
In 1963, Hales and Jewett published the Hales–Jewett theorem, which is a standard part of Ramsey theory now. They motivated their theorem as a form of game theory: it shows that certain high-dimensional generalizations of tic tac toe cannot have any tied positions.

Hales also contributed to Solomon W. Golomb's highly cited work on shift registers, and he has been noted for his work using Ulm invariants to characterize infinite abelian groups.

== Awards and honors ==
In 1971, Hales shared the George Pólya Prize with Ronald Graham, Klaus Leeb, Bruce Lee Rothschild, and Robert I. Jewett, for their work in Ramsey theory. In 2009, Hales was elected a Fellow of the AAAS, and in 2013 he became a fellow of the American Mathematical Society.

== Selected publications ==
- Hales, A. W.; Jewett, R. I. (1963), "Regularity and positional games", Transactions of the American Mathematical Society, 106 (2): 222–229, doi:10.2307/1993764, JSTOR 1993764, MR 0143712
