= Graham–Pollak theorem =

Partition of the edges of the complete graph $K_6$ into five complete bipartite subgraphs: $K_{2,2}$ (light red), $K_{2,3}$ (light blue), $K_{1,3}$ (yellow), and two copies of $K_{1,1}$ (dark red and dark blue). According to the Graham–Pollak theorem, a partition into fewer than five complete bipartite subgraphs is not possible.

In graph theory, the Graham–Pollak theorem states that the edges of an $n$-vertex complete graph cannot be partitioned into fewer than $n-1$ complete bipartite graphs. It was first published by Ronald Graham and Henry O. Pollak in two papers in 1971 and 1972 (crediting Hans Witsenhausen for a key lemma), in connection with an application to telephone switching circuitry.

The theorem has since become well known and repeatedly studied and generalized in graph theory, in part because of its elegant proof using techniques from algebraic graph theory. More strongly, Aigner & Ziegler (2018) write that all proofs are somehow based on linear algebra: "no combinatorial proof for this result is known".

== Construction of an optimal partition ==
A partition into exactly $n-1$ complete bipartite graphs is easy to obtain: just order the vertices, and for each vertex except the last, form a star connecting it to all later vertices in the ordering. Other partitions are also possible.

== Proof of optimality ==
The proof of the Graham–Pollak theorem described by Aigner & Ziegler (2018) (following Tverberg 1982) defines a real variable $x_i$ for each vertex $v_i\in V$, where $V$ denotes the set of all vertices in the graph. Let the left sides and right sides of the $k$th bipartite graph be denoted $L_k$ and $R_k$, respectively and for any set $S$ of vertices define $X(S)$ to be the sum of variables for vertices in $S$:

$$X(S)=\sum_{v_i\in S} x_i.$$

Then, in terms of this notation, the fact that the bipartite graphs partition the edges of the complete graph can be expressed as the equation

$$\sum_{i<j}x_ix_j=\sum_k X(L_k) X(R_k).$$

Now consider the system of linear equations that sets $X(V)=0$ and $X(L_k)=0$ for each $k$. Any solution to this system of equations would also obey the nonlinear equations

$$\begin{align}
0&=X(V)^2=\Bigl(\sum_i x_i\Bigr)^2\\
&=\Bigl(\sum_i x_i^2\Bigr) + \Bigl(2\sum_{i<j} x_ix_j\Bigr)\\
&=\Bigl(\sum_i x_i^2\Bigr) + \Bigl(2\sum_k X(L_k) X(R_k)\Bigr)\\
&=\sum_i x_i^2.\\
\end{align}$$

But a sum of squares of real variables can only be zero if all the individual variables are zero, the trivial solution to the system of linear equations. If there were fewer than $n-1$ complete bipartite graphs, the system of equations would have fewer than $n$ equations in $n$ unknowns and would have a nontrivial solution, a contradiction. So the number of complete bipartite graphs must be at least $n-1$.

== Related problems ==
=== Distance labeling ===
Graham and Pollak study a more general graph labeling problem, in which the vertices of a graph should be labeled with equal-length strings of the characters "0", "1", and "✶", in such a way that the distance between any two vertices equals the number of string positions where one vertex is labeled with a 0 and the other is labeled with a 1. A labeling like this with no "✶" characters would give an isometric embedding into a hypercube, something that is only possible for graphs that are partial cubes, and in one of their papers Graham and Pollak call a labeling that allows "✶" characters an embedding into a "squashed cube".

For each position of the label strings, one can define a complete bipartite graph in which one side of the bipartition consists of the vertices labeled with 0 in that position and the other side consists of the vertices labeled with 1, omitting the vertices labeled "✶". For the complete graph, every two vertices are at distance one from each other, so every edge must belong to exactly one of these complete bipartite graphs. In this way, a labeling of this type for the complete graph corresponds to a partition of its edges into complete bipartite graphs, with the lengths of the labels corresponding to the number of graphs in the partition.

=== Alon–Saks–Seymour conjecture ===
Noga Alon, Michael Saks, and Paul Seymour formulated a conjecture in the early 1990s that, if true, would significantly generalize the Graham–Pollak theorem: they conjectured that, whenever a graph of chromatic number $k+1$ has its edges partitioned into complete bipartite subgraphs, at least $k$ subgraphs are needed. Equivalently, their conjecture states that edge-disjoint unions of $k$ complete bipartite graphs can always be colored with at most $k+1$ colors. The conjecture was disproved by Hao Huang and Benny Sudakov in 2012, who constructed families of graphs formed as edge-disjoint unions of $k$ complete bipartite graphs that require $\Omega(k^{6/5})$ colors. More strongly, the number of colors can be as large as $\exp \log^{2-o(1)} k$, tight up to the $o(1)$ term in the exponent.

=== Biclique partition ===
The biclique partition problem takes as input an arbitrary undirected graph, and asks for a partition of its edges into a minimum number of complete bipartite graphs. It is NP-hard, but fixed-parameter tractable. The best approximation algorithm known for the problem has an approximation ratio of $O(n/\log n)$.
