= Steve Mills (juggler) =

American juggler and unicyclist (1957–2023)

Steve Mills (September 16, 1957 – June 3, 2023) was an American juggler and unicyclist from Morristown, New Jersey. He was the inventor of the "Mills' Mess" juggling pattern. Mills was taught to juggle by Ron Graham, a juggler and mathematician.

== The Dazzling Mills Family ==
In 1978, Mills married Carol Sue Haines. They began performing a juggling and unicycle act, later accompanied by their children Michelle and Anthony. Together the group became known as The Dazzling Mills Family.

They had performed at venues such as Harlem Globetrotters basketball games, the Arnold Fitness Expo, fairs, and schools. Television appearances included PM Magazine, The Statler Brothers Show, The Penn and Teller Show, Daily Planet, Most Daring, Smoking Gun Presents, and The Shotgun Red Variety Show.

Carol stopped performing in 2004 because of a nerve disorder. Kris Groth, who married Michelle in 2009, joined the group in 2008. In 2011, a baby girl, Chloe, was born to Kris and Michelle. In 2014, the group's web site stopped advertising for the group and was moved to advertising Steve as a solo act. The web site subsequently went dark in late 2017.

== Awards ==
Mills was a winner of the International Jugglers' Association Championships in 1975, 1976 and 1978.
