= Henry O. Pollak =

Austrian-American mathematician (1927–2026)

- Born: Henry Otto Pollak; December 13, 1927; Vienna, Austria
- Died: July 8, 2026 (aged 98)
- Education: Yale University (BS); Harvard University (MA, PhD)
- Occupation: Mathematician
- Known for: Contributions to information theory

Henry Otto Pollak (December 13, 1927 – July 8, 2026) was an Austrian-American mathematician who has made significant contributions to operator theory, signal analysis, graph theory, and computational geometry.

== Life and career ==
Born in Vienna, Austria, the only child of a lawyer, Pollak fled the Nazis with his family in 1939, first to England and then in 1940 to the US. He received his BS in Mathematics (1947) from Yale University. While at Yale, he participated in the William Lowell Putnam Mathematical Competition and was on the team representing Yale University (along with Murray Gell-Mann and Murray Gerstenhaber) that won the second prize in 1947. He earned an M.A. and Ph.D. (1951) degree in mathematics from Harvard University, the latter on the thesis Some Estimates for Extremal Distance advised by Lars Ahlfors.

Pollak then joined Bell Labs (1951), where he later became director of the Mathematics and Statistics Research Center. He has held teaching positions in the mathematics department at Columbia University.

Pollak died on July 8, 2026, at the age of 98.

== Research ==
In several papers with David Slepian and Henry Landau, Pollak developed the theory of what are now known as the Landau–Pollak–Slepian operators on simultaneously time-limited and band-limited functions in operator theory. This work marked an early form of wavelet-based signal analysis.

With Ronald Graham he is the namesake of the Graham–Pollak theorem in graph theory, a result on partitioning the edges of complete graphs into complete bipartite graphs that they published in the early 1970s.

With Edgar Gilbert he is the namesake of the Gilbert–Pollak conjecture relating Steiner trees to Euclidean minimum spanning trees in computational geometry. After they formulated this problem in 1968, it was believed to be proven by Du and Hwang in the early 1990s, but the proof was later determined to be flawed and the problem remains open.

== Awards ==
- Fellow of the American Association for the Advancement of Science (1971)
- Earle Raymond Hedrick lecturer (1973)
- Mathematical Association of America chair of New Jersey section (1958–59), governor (1961–63) and president (1975–76).
- Honorary doctorate from Bowdoin College (1977)
- Honorary doctorate from Eindhoven University of Technology (1981)
- Mathematical Association of America (MAA) Meritorious Service Award (1990)
- MAA Gung and Hu Distinguished Service to Mathematics Award (1993)
- National Council of Teachers of Mathematics Lifetime Achievement Award (2010)
- Mathematical Association of America Mary P. Dolciani Award in 2020.

== Selected publications ==
- Slepian, D.; Pollak, H. O. (1961). "Prolate spheroidal wave functions, Fourier analysis and uncertainty. I". The Bell System Technical Journal. 40: 43–63. doi:10.1002/j.1538-7305.1961.tb03976.x. MR 0140732.
- Landau, H. J.; Pollak, H. O. (1961). "Prolate spheroidal wave functions, Fourier analysis and uncertainty. II". The Bell System Technical Journal. 40: 65–84. doi:10.1002/j.1538-7305.1961.tb03977.x. MR 0140733.
- Landau, H. J.; Pollak, H. O. (1962), "Prolate spheroidal wave functions, Fourier analysis and uncertainty. III. The dimension of the space of essentially time- and band-limited signals", The Bell System Technical Journal, 41: 1295–1336, doi:10.1002/j.1538-7305.1962.tb03279.x, MR 0147686
- Gilbert, E. N.; Pollak, H. O. (1968). "Steiner minimal trees". SIAM Journal on Applied Mathematics. 16: 1–29. doi:10.1137/0116001. MR 0223269.
- Graham, R. L.; Pollak, H. O. (1971). "On the addressing problem for loop switching". The Bell System Technical Journal. 50 (8): 2495–2519. doi:10.1002/j.1538-7305.1971.tb02618.x. MR 0289210.
- Graham, R. L.; Pollak, H. O. (1972). "On embedding graphs in squashed cubes". Graph theory and applications (Proc. Conf., Western Michigan Univ., Kalamazoo, Mich., 1972; dedicated to the memory of J. W. T. Youngs). Lecture Notes in Mathematics. Vol. 303. pp. 99–110. MR 0332576.
