= Partition refinement =

In the design of algorithms, partition refinement is a technique for representing a partition of a set as a data structure that allows the partition to be refined by splitting its sets into a larger number of smaller sets. In that sense it is dual to the union-find data structure, which also maintains a partition into disjoint sets but in which the operations merge pairs of sets. In some applications of partition refinement, such as lexicographic breadth-first search, the data structure maintains as well an ordering on the sets in the partition.

Partition refinement forms a key component of several efficient algorithms on graphs and finite automata, including DFA minimization, the Coffman–Graham algorithm for parallel scheduling, and lexicographic breadth-first search of graphs.

== Data structure ==
A partition refinement algorithm maintains a family of disjoint sets S_{i}. At the start of the algorithm, this family contains a single set of all the elements in the data structure. At each step of the algorithm, a set X is presented to the algorithm, and each set S_{i} in the family that contains members of X is split into two sets, the intersection S_{i} ∩ X and the difference S_{i} \ X.

Such an algorithm may be implemented efficiently by maintaining data structures representing the following information:

- The ordered sequence of the sets S_{i} in the family, in a form such as a doubly linked list that allows new sets to be inserted into the middle of the sequence
- Associated with each set S_{i}, a collection of its elements of S_{i}, in a form such as a doubly linked list or array data structure that allows for rapid deletion of individual elements from the collection. Alternatively, this component of the data structure may be represented by storing all of the elements of all of the sets in a single array, sorted by the identity of the set they belong to, and by representing the collection of elements in any set S_{i} by its starting and ending positions in this array.
- Associated with each element, the set it belongs to.

To perform a refinement operation, the algorithm loops through the elements of the given set X. For each such element x, it finds the set S_{i} that contains x, and checks whether a second set for S_{i} ∩ X has already been started. If not, it creates the second set and adds S_{i} to a list L of the sets that are split by the operation. Then, regardless of whether a new set was formed, the algorithm removes x from S_{i} and adds it to S_{i} ∩ X. In the representation in which all elements are stored in a single array, moving x from one set to another may be performed by swapping x with the final element of S_{i} and then decrementing the end index of S_{i} and the start index of the new set. Finally, after all elements of X have been processed in this way, the algorithm loops through L, separating each current set S_{i} from the second set that has been split from it, and reports both of these sets as being newly formed by the refinement operation.

The time to perform a single refinement operation in this way is O(|X|), independent of the number of elements in the family of sets and also independent of the total number of sets in the data structure. Thus, the time for a sequence of refinements is proportional to the total size of the sets given to the algorithm in each refinement step.

== Applications ==
An early application of partition refinement was in an algorithm by Hopcroft (1971) for DFA minimization. In this problem, one is given as input a deterministic finite automaton, and must find an equivalent automaton with as few states as possible. Hopcroft's algorithm maintains a partition of the states of the input automaton into subsets, with the property that any two states in different subsets must be mapped to different states of the output automaton. Initially, there are two subsets, one containing all the accepting states of the automaton and one containing the remaining states. At each step one of the subsets S_{i} and one of the input symbols x of the automaton are chosen, and the subsets of states are refined into states for which a transition labeled x would lead to S_{i}, and states for which an x-transition would lead somewhere else. When a set S_{i} that has already been chosen is split by a refinement, only one of the two resulting sets (the smaller of the two) needs to be chosen again; in this way, each state participates in the sets X for O(s log n) refinement steps and the overall algorithm takes time O(ns log n), where n is the number of initial states and s is the size of the alphabet.

Partition refinement was applied by Sethi (1976) in an efficient implementation of the Coffman–Graham algorithm for parallel scheduling. Sethi showed that it could be used to construct a lexicographically ordered topological sort of a given directed acyclic graph in linear time; this lexicographic topological ordering is one of the key steps of the Coffman–Graham algorithm. In this application, the elements of the disjoint sets are vertices of the input graph and the sets X used to refine the partition are sets of neighbors of vertices. Since the total number of neighbors of all vertices is just the number of edges in the graph, the algorithm takes time linear in the number of edges, its input size.

Partition refinement also forms a key step in lexicographic breadth-first search, a graph search algorithm with applications in the recognition of chordal graphs and several other important classes of graphs. Again, the disjoint set elements are vertices and the set X represents sets of neighbors, so the algorithm takes linear time.
