= Erdős on Graphs =

1998 book by Fan Chung

Erdős on Graphs: His Legacy of Unsolved Problems
- Author: Fan Chung; Ronald Graham
- Language: English
- Genre: Mathematics
- Publisher: A K Peters
- Publication date: 1998

Erdős on Graphs: His Legacy of Unsolved Problems is a book on unsolved problems in mathematics collected by Paul Erdős in the area of graph theory. It was written by Fan Chung and Ronald Graham, based on a 1997 survey paper by Chung, and published in 1998 by A K Peters. A softcover edition with some updates and corrections followed in 1999.

== Topics ==
The book has eight chapters, the first being a short introduction. Its main content are six chapters of unsolved problems, grouped by subtopic. Chapters two and three are on Ramsey theory and extremal graph theory. The fourth covers topics in graph coloring, packing problems, and covering problems. The fifth concerns graph enumeration and random graphs, the sixth generalizes from graphs to hypergraphs, and the seventh concerns infinite graphs. The book concludes with a chapter of stories about Erdős from one of his oldest friends, Andrew Vázsonyi.

Each chapter begins with a survey of the history and major results in the subtopic of graph theory that it covers; Erdős himself figures prominently in the history of several of these subtopics. The individual history, motivation, known progress, and bibliographic references for each problem are included, along with (in some cases) prizes for a solution originally offered by Erdős and maintained by Chung and Graham.

== Audience and reception ==
One target audience for the book is researchers in graph theory, for whom these problems may provide material for much future research. They may also provide an inspiration for students of mathematics, and reviewer Arthur Hobbs suggests that the book could even be used as the basis for a graduate course. Additionally, reviewers Robert Beezer and W. T. Tutte suggest that the book may be of interests to mathematicians in other areas, and to historians of mathematics, for the insight it provides into Erdős's life and work. Ralph Faudree writes that the book is suitable both as reference material and for browsing.

Tutte notes, for those not familiar with the topic, that in mathematics, a well-posed and unsolved problem can itself be a significant contribution, a success rather than a failure. In a similar vein of thought, Faudree adds that the book provides "an appropriate tribute" to Erdős and his history of both formulating and solving problems.
