= Information Processing Letters =

- Discipline: Computer science
- Language: English
- Edited by: Leah Epstein

Publication details
- History: 1971–present
- Publisher: Elsevier (Netherlands)
- Frequency: 24/year
- Open access: no
- Impact factor: 0.959 (2020)

Standard abbreviations
- ISO 4: Inf. Process. Lett.
- MathSciNet: Inform. Process. Lett.

Indexing
- ISSN: 0020-0190
- OCLC no.: 38995181

Links
- Journal homepage; Online access

Information Processing Letters is a peer-reviewed scientific journal in the field of computer science, published by Elsevier. The aim of the journal is to enable fast dissemination of results in the field of information processing in the form of short papers. Submissions are limited to nine double-spaced pages.

The scope of IPL covers fundamental aspects of information processing and computing. This naturally covers topics in the broadly understood field of theoretical computer science, including algorithms, formal languages and automata, computational complexity, computational logic, distributed and parallel algorithms, computational geometry, learning theory, computational number theory, computational biology, coding theory, theoretical cryptography, and applied discrete mathematics. Generally, submissions in all areas of scientific inquiry are considered, provided that they describe research contributions credibly motivated by applications to computing and involve rigorous methodology. High quality experimental papers that address topics of sufficiently broad interest are also considered.

IPL implements a 3-tier review process. Each submissions is assigned to an associate editor, who determines whether it falls within IPL's scope and meets basic quality criteria. On average, about 60% of submissions are desk-rejected by associate editors. Submissions determined to be suitable for further review are distributed between the members of the editorial board, who handle the review process, which typically involves soliciting external reviews from 2-3 experts in the area. Between 2017 and 2020, the overall acceptance rate in IPL averaged 20–25%.

Established in 1971, IPL is one of the oldest journals in computer science. In its now over 50-year old history, IPL has published research contributions from leading figures in computer science research, including multiple Turing Award winners: Alan Perlis, Edsger Dijkstra, Donald Knuth, Robert Floyd, Stephen Cook, Niklaus Wirth, Richard Karp, John Hopcroft, Robert Tarjan, Ronald Rivest, Edmund Clarke, Judea Perl, Silvio Micali, and Leslie Lamport. Among its earlier, pre-1990 articles, its list of influential papers includes the following:

- Graham, R.L., An efficient algorithm for determining the convex hull of a finite planar set, 1972
- Hyafil, L., Rivest, R.L., Constructing optimal binary decision trees is NP-complete, 1976
- Garey, M.R., Johnson, D.S., Preparata, F.P., Tarjan, R.E., Triangulating a simple polygon, 1978
- Aspvall, B., Plass, M.F., Tarjan, R.E., A linear-time algorithm for testing the truth of certain quantified boolean formulas, 1979
- Dijkstra, E.W., Scholten, C.S., Termination detection for diffusing computations, 1980
- Peterson, G.L., Myths about the mutual exclusion problem, 1981
- Crochemore, M., An optimal algorithm for computing the repetitions in a word, 1981
- Fischer, M.J., Lynch, N.A., A lower bound for the time to assure interactive consistency, 1982
- Alpern, B., Schneider, F.B., Defining liveness, 1985
- Reif, J.H., Depth-first search is inherently sequential, 1985
- Apt, K.R., Kozen, D.C., Limits for automatic verification of finite-state concurrent systems, 1986
- Blumer, A., Ehrenfeucht, A., Haussler, D., Warmuth, M.K., Occam's Razor, 1987
- Boppana, R.B., Hastad, J., Zachos, S., Does co-NP have short interactive proofs?, 1987
- Korel, B., Laski, J., Dynamic program slicing, 1988
- Kamada, T., Kawai, S., An algorithm for drawing general undirected graphs, 1989
