= Steve Butler (mathematician) =

American mathematician (born 1977)

Steven Kay Butler
- Born: May 16, 1977 (age 49)
- Education: University of California, San Diego; Brigham Young University
- Scientific career
- Fields: Graph theory and Combinatorics
- Workplaces: Iowa State University; University of California, Los Angeles
- Thesis: Eigenvalues and structures of graphs (2008)
- Doctoral advisor: Fan Chung

Steven Kay Butler (born May 16, 1977) is an American mathematician specializing in graph theory and combinatorics. He is a Morrill Professor and the Barbara J. Janson Professor in Mathematics at Iowa State University.

== Education and career ==
Butler earned his master's degree at Brigham Young University in 2003. His master's thesis was titled Bounding the Number of Graphs Containing Very Long Induced Paths. He completed a doctorate at the University of California, San Diego in 2008, authoring the dissertation Eigenvalues and Structures of Graphs, advised by Fan Chung. Upon completing his postdoctoral studies at the University of California, Los Angeles, Butler joined the Iowa State University faculty in 2011. In 2015, Butler became the 512th (and so far final) person to have an Erdős number of 1, when he published a paper with Paul Erdős and Ronald Graham on Egyptian fractions. In 2017, Butler was named the Barbara J. Janson Professor in Mathematics, and to a Morrill Professorship in 2022.

== Work with undergraduates ==
Butler has been a project lead for the Iowa State University Math REU in 2015, 2017, 2019, 2022, 2023, and 2024, and 2025.
