= The Man Who Loved Only Numbers =

Book by Paul Hoffman

- Front cover
- Author: Paul Hoffman
- Original title: The Man Who Loved Only Numbers: The Story of Paul Erdős and the Search for Mathematical Truth
- Language: English
- Genre: Biography
- Published: July 15, 1998
- Publisher: Hyperion Books
- Publication place: United States
- Media type: Print
- Pages: 301 pp.
- ISBN: 978-0786863624

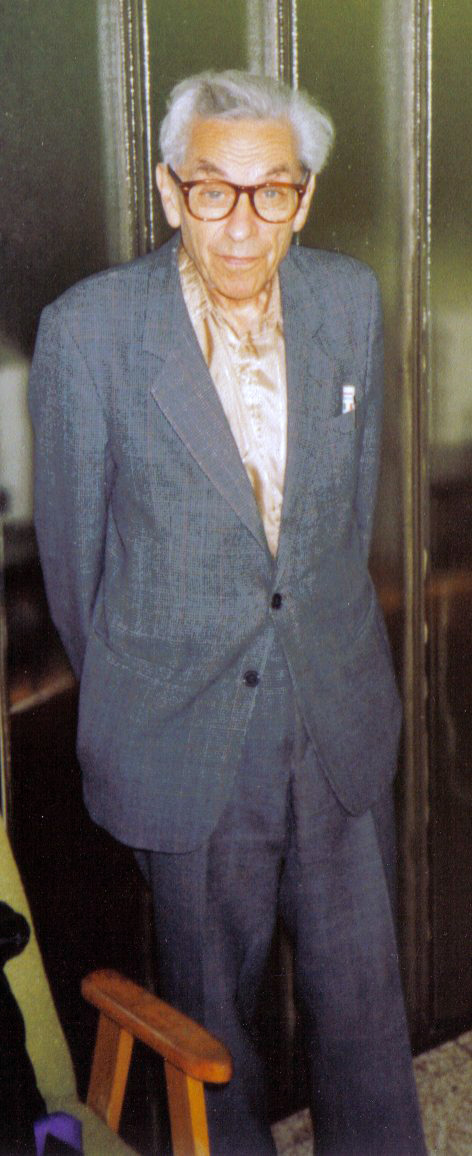
The Man Who Loved Only Numbers describes how Paul Erdős visited Jon Folkman after Folkman awoke from surgery for brain cancer. To restore Folkman's confidence, Erdős immediately challenged him to solve mathematical problems.

The Man Who Loved Only Numbers is a biography of mathematician Paul Erdős written by Paul Hoffman. The book was first published on July 15, 1998, by Hyperion Books as a hardcover edition. A paperback edition appeared in 1999. The book is, in the words of the author, "a work in oral history based on the recollections of Erdős, his collaborators and their spouses". The book was a bestseller in the United Kingdom and has been published in 15 different languages. The book won the 1999 Rhône-Poulenc Prize, beating many distinguished and established writers, including E. O. Wilson.

== How the book came about ==
Hoffman received an assignment by The Atlantic Monthly in 1987 to profile Erdős, which won the National Magazine Award for feature writing. After this, Hoffman followed Erdős on his travels for the last 10 years of his life learning about his exceedingly unusual life and interviewing his numerous collaborators in the process of writing this book.

== Content ==
A large part of the book concerns Erdős, but a lot of it is about other mathematicians, past and present, including Ronald Graham, Carl Friedrich Gauss, Srinivasa Ramanujan, and G.H. Hardy. In the book, Erdős enjoys listening to Hardy when he speaks about Ramanujan. Hoffman also tries to give examples of what mathematics is and why he views it as important, and why many mathematicians such as Erdős devote their whole lives to mathematics. It also contains some history of Europe and the United States during Erdős's time.

The book overall portrays Erdős in a favorable light, pointing out his many endearing qualities, like his childlike simplicity, his generosity and altruistic nature, and his kindness and gentleness towards children. However, it also attempts to illustrate his helplessness in doing mundane tasks, the difficulties faced by those close to him because of his eccentricities, and his stubborn and frustrating behavior.

=== Erdős's nursing of Jon Folkman ===
Hoffman reports the following anecdote, which displays Erdős's single-minded devotion to his friends and mathematics. In the late 1960s, the young mathematician Jon Folkman was diagnosed as having advanced brain cancer. During Folkman's hospitalization, he was visited repeatedly by Ronald Graham and Paul Erdős. After his brain surgery, Folkman was despairing that he had lost his mathematical skills. As soon as Folkman received Graham and Erdős at the hospital, Erdős challenged Folkman with mathematical problems, helping to rebuild his confidence.

Hoffman notes that Folkman's recovery was short-lived. Notwithstanding his ability to solve the problems posed by Erdős, Folkman purchased a gun and killed himself. Folkman's supervisor at RAND, Delbert Ray Fulkerson, blamed himself for failing to notice suicidal behaviors in Folkman. Years later Fulkerson also killed himself.

== Writing style ==
The book is mostly written without much technical detail and can be read by anyone without a mathematical background. Hoffman does give some relatively simple examples of mathematical problems throughout the book (like Cantor's diagonal argument) to illustrate some of the ideas in modern mathematics.
