= Bruce Lee Rothschild =

American mathematician

- Born: August 26, 1941 (age 84); Los Angeles, California
- Education: Yale University
- Occupations: Mathematician and educator
- Notable work: Graham–Rothschild theorem

Bruce Lee Rothschild (born August 26, 1941) is an American mathematician specializing in combinatorics, best known for his foundational contributions to Ramsey theory and extremal set theory. He is a professor emeritus of mathematics at the University of California, Los Angeles.

== Early life and education ==
Bruce Lee Rothschild was born on August 26, 1941, in Los Angeles, California. He completed his undergraduate studies at the California Institute of Technology (Caltech), where he earned a Bachelor of Science degree in mathematics in 1963. He subsequently attended Yale University for his graduate studies, earning his Ph.D. in mathematics in 1967. His doctoral dissertation, titled A Generalization of Ramsey's Theorem and a Conjecture of Rota, was supervised by Øystein Ore.

== Academic career ==
Following his doctorate, Rothschild took a position as an instructor at the Massachusetts Institute of Technology, where he taught from 1967 to 1969. He also served as a consultant for Bell Labs (1968–1971), where he collaborated with Ronald Graham.

Rothschild joined the mathematics faculty at the University of California, Los Angeles (UCLA) as an assistant professor in 1971. He was promoted to associate professor in 1973 and became a full professor in 1977.

== Mathematical contributions ==
Rothschild, together with Ronald Graham, formulated one of the most monumental results in Ramsey theory, the Graham–Rothschild theorem. He has collaborated with American mathematicians Joel Spencer and Ronald Graham on key texts related to Ramsey theory. Rothschild wrote several papers with Paul Erdős, giving him an Erdős number of 1.

== Awards and honors ==
In 1971, Rothschild was named one of the inaugural recipients of the George Pólya Prize in Applied Combinatorics awarded by the Society for Industrial and Applied Mathematics (SIAM), sharing the honor with Ronald L. Graham, Klaus Leeb, Alfred W. Hales, and Robert I. Jewett. Other notable honors include Sloan Research Fellowship (1973–1975), fellow of the American Association for the Advancement of Science (AAAS), and fellow of the American Mathematical Society (AMS) (elected in 2012 as part of the inaugural 2013 class)

== Selected publications ==
- Graham, R. L.; Rothschild, B. L. (1971). "Ramsey's Theorem for n-Parameter Sets". Transactions of the American Mathematical Society. 159: 257–292. doi:10.2307/1996010. JSTOR 1996010.
- Erdős, P.; Graham, R. L.; Montgomery, P.; Rothschild, B. L.; Spencer, J.; Straus, E. G. (1973). "Euclidean Ramsey Theorems. I.". Journal of Combinatorial Theory, Series A. 14 (3): 341–363. doi:10.1016/0097-3165(73)90011-3.
- Graham, Ronald L.; Rothschild, Bruce L.; Spencer, Joel H. (1980). Ramsey Theory (1st ed.). John Wiley & Sons. ISBN 0-471-05997-8. (2nd edition published in 1990, ISBN 978-0-471-50046-9)
