= Edward G. Coffman Jr. =

Computer scientist

- Born: 16 August 1934 (age 92); Los Angeles, US
- Education: University of California, Los Angeles
- Known for: Mathematical modeling and analysis in computer engineering and operations research
- Awards: ACM Outstanding Contribution Award; ACM Distinguished Service Award; ACM Sigmetrics Achievement Award; CORS Larnder Prize Fellow ACM, IEEE
- Scientific career
- Fields: Electrical Engineering, Computer Science, Operations Research
- Workplaces: Princeton University; Pennsylvania State University; University of California, Santa Barbara; Bell Laboratories; New Jersey Institute of Technology; Columbia University
- Thesis: Stochastic Models of Multiple and Time-shared Computer Operations (1966)

Edward Grady "Ed" Coffman Jr. is a computer scientist. He began his career as a systems programmer at the System Development Corporation (SDC) during the period 1958–65. His PhD in engineering at UCLA in 1966 was followed by a series of positions at Princeton University (1966–69), The Pennsylvania State University (1970–76), Columbia University (1976–77), and the University of California, Santa Barbara (1977–79). In 1979, he joined the Mathematics Center at Bell Laboratories where he stayed until his retirement as a Distinguished Member of Technical Staff 20 years later. After a one-year stint at the New Jersey Institute of Technology, he returned to Columbia University in 2000 with appointments in Computer Science, Electrical Engineering, and Industrial Engineering and Operations Research. He retired from teaching in 2008 and is now a professor emeritus still engaged in research and professional activities.

== Research ==
Coffman is best known for his seminal research together with his international collaborations, measured in part by some 150 co-authors in his collection of publications. His work can be found in over 180 articles in technical journals devoted to original research contributions. He published 4 graduate-level text books, and papers in the proceedings of some 250 conferences and workshops, most of these being preliminary versions of journal articles. In his research, Coffman has been a generalist following many parallel paths in engineering and applied mathematics. The directions he has taken have drawn on the tools of combinatorial optimization and the theory of algorithms, along with those of applied probability and stochastic processes. The processes studied include those in the theories of scheduling, bin packing, sequential selection, graphs, and dynamic allocation, along with those in queueing, polling, reservation, moving-server, networking, and distributed local-rule systems (e.g. cellular automata). His contributions have been divided between mathematical foundations and the design and analysis of approximation algorithms providing the basis for engineering solutions to NP-hard problems. Computer and network engineering applications have been broad in scope; a partial list includes research addressing problems in the scheduling and storage allocation functions of computer operating systems, storage architectures, data structures, computer timing problems such as deadlocks and synchronization, Internet congestion, peer-to-peer file sharing networks, stream merging, self-assembly processes of molecular computing, minimalist algorithms in sensor networks, optical burst switching, and dynamic spectrum management in cognitive networks. The list expands greatly when including the myriad applications in industrial engineering and operations research of Coffman's research in scheduling and bin-packing theory in one and two dimensions. As of 11 November 2015, his works have been cited 13,597 times, and he has an h-index of 55.

Coffman has been active professionally serving on several editorial boards, dozens of technical program committees, setting research agendas in workshops of the National Research Council, co-founding the Symposium on Operating Systems Principles, and the special interest groups on performance evaluation of both ACM and IFIPS.

== Selected publications ==
- 1964, with Jules Schwartz and Clark Weissman. "A General Purpose Time-Sharing System". Spartan Books.
- 1973, with Peter Denning. Operating Systems Theory. Prentice-Hall.
- 2022, with Lycee Pierre de Fermat. Prof de NSI. Bernard ONNO.

== See also ==
- Coffman–Graham algorithm
- Deadlock
