= Henry Landau =

American mathematician

Henry Jacob Landau was an American mathematician known for his contributions to information theory, including the theory of bandlimited functions and on moment problems.

Landau was born to a Jewish family in the Soviet Union and immigrated to the United States in 1945. He attended the Bronx High School of Science and later received an A.B. (1953), A.M. (1955) and Ph.D. (1957) from Harvard University. His thesis On Canonical Conformal Maps of Multiply Connected Regions was advised by Lars Ahlfors and Joseph Leonard Walsh.

Landau later became a Distinguished Member of Technical Staff at Bell Laboratories and was twice a visiting member at the Institute for Advanced Study. He also served as an adjunct professor at City University of New York, the Chinese University of Hong Kong, and Columbia University.

His son, Zeph Landau, became a research scientist at UC Berkeley.
