= Ernest S. Croot III =

American mathematician

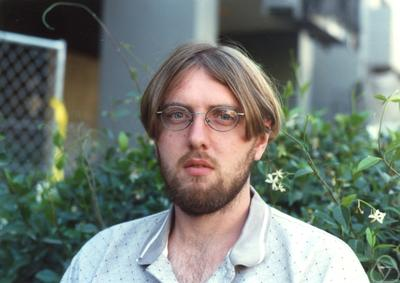
- Born: 30 July 1972 (age 54)
- Education: University of Georgia; Centre College
- Scientific career
- Fields: Mathematics
- Workplaces: Georgia Institute of Technology

Ernest S. Croot III is a mathematician and professor at the School of Mathematics, Georgia Institute of Technology. He is known for his solution of the Erdős–Graham conjecture, and for contributing to the solution of the cap set problem.

== Education ==
Ernest Croot attended Centre College at Danville, Kentucky, where he received a B.S. in Mathematics and a B.S. in Computer Science in 1994. In 2000, he completed a Ph.D. in Mathematics at the University of Georgia under the supervision of Andrew Granville.
