= Robert I. Jewett =

American mathematician (1937–2022)

Robert Israel "Bob" Jewett
- Born: December 14, 1937; Providence, Rhode Island
- Died: July 30, 2022 (aged 84)
- Occupation: Mathematician

Robert Israel "Bob" Jewett (December 14, 1937 – July 30, 2022) was an American mathematician and one of the namesakes of Hales–Jewett theorem. He researched harmonic analysis, ergodic theory, differential equations, and combinatorics.

== Professional career ==
After graduating from the California Institute of Technology and obtaining his PhD in mathematics from the University of Oregon, he taught as a professor of mathematics at Western Washington University for 40 years until he eventually retired in 2010.
