= Paul Hoffman (science writer) =

American writer

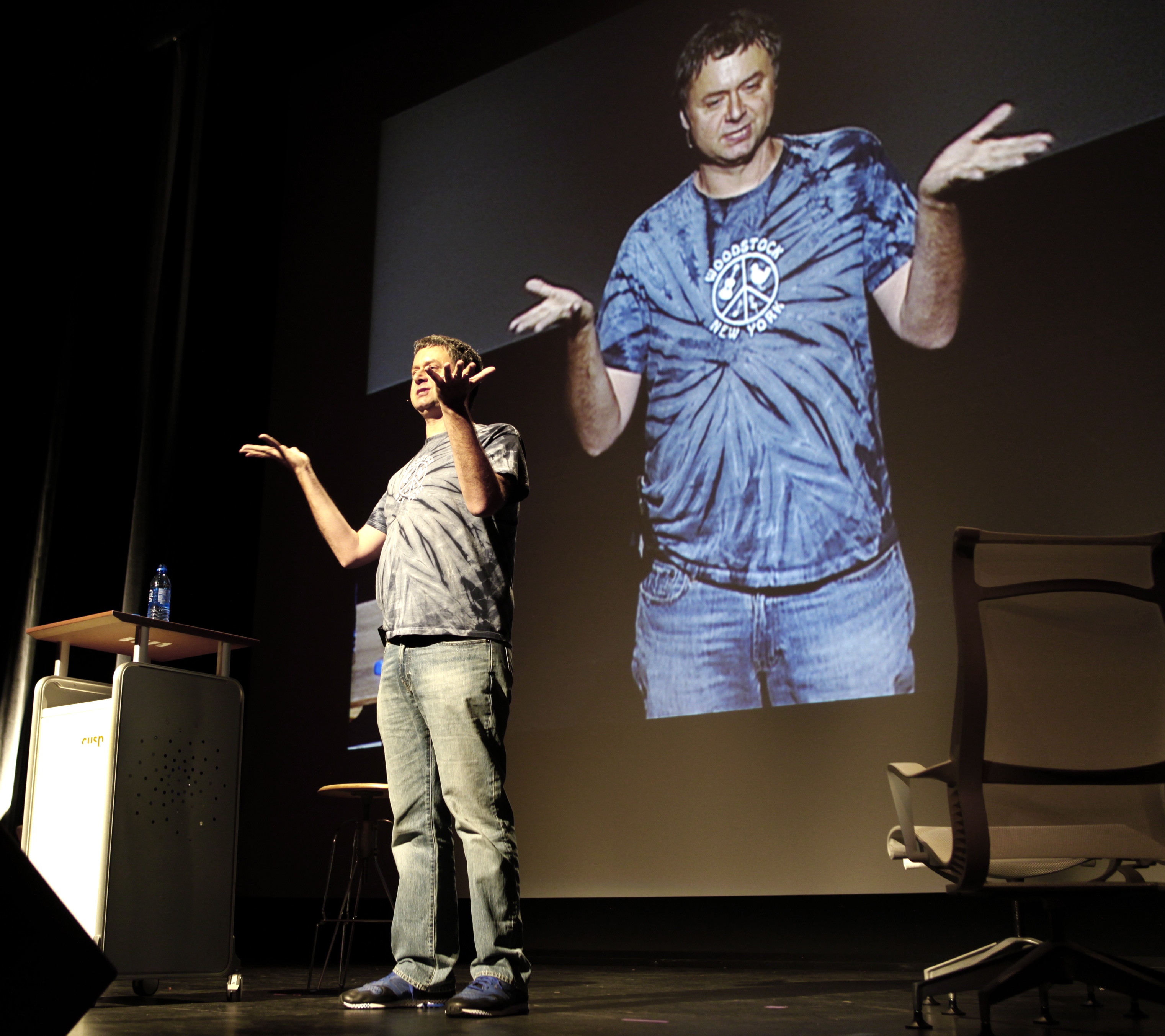
- Born: March 30, 1956 (age 70)
- Education: Harvard University
- Writing career
- Notable work: The Man Who Loved Only Numbers
- Notable awards: Royal Society Science Books Prize

Paul Hoffman (born March 30, 1956) is the president and CEO of the Liberty Science Center in Jersey City, New Jersey. He is also a prominent author, science educator, food entrepreneur, storyteller, and host of the PBS television series Great Minds of Science. He won the Royal Society Science Book Prize for The Man Who Loved Only Numbers, a biography of Paul Erdős.

== Career ==
Hoffman holds a B.A. degree summa cum laude from Harvard, is the winner of the first National Magazine Award for Feature Writing and is a member of the American Academy of Arts and Sciences. Chicago magazine once called him "the smartest man in the world," but Hoffman claims the editors must have caught him on a particularly good day. The New York Times called him "the mayor of strange places" because of his penchant for checking in at out-of-the-way places on Foursquare. He won a National Magazine Award for his article of Paul Erdős. This grew into The Man Who Loved Only Numbers, which won Royal Society Science Books Prize.

Hoffman was president and editor in chief of Discover. He served as president and publisher of Encyclopædia Britannica before returning full-time to writing and consulting work. He lives in Brooklyn and Woodstock, New York. He has appeared on CBS This Morning and The NewsHour with Jim Lehrer as a correspondent. He is a paradoxologist under the pseudonym Dr. Crypton. He designed the puzzle in the book Treasure: In Search of the Golden Horse (1984). That year, he designed the treasure map in Romancing the Stone, starring Michael Douglas, Kathleen Turner, and Danny DeVito. Hoffman is a chess player rated around 1900 (or class-A level) who was the last man standing when world champion Magnus Carlsen played blindfold blitz chess against three challengers.

Hoffman was the editorial chairman of the video interview website Big Think, where he personally interviewed Dick Cavett, Richard Dawkins, Annie Duke, Arianna Huffington, John Irving, Penn Jillette, Anatoly Karpov, Garry Kasparov and Ed Koch, among others. He joined the Liberty Science Center, Jersey City, in October 2011.

Hoffman was the creative director of the Beyond Rubik's Cube exhibition, which appeared at venues around the world starting with the LSC, the Great Lakes Science Center in Cleveland, and Telus World of Science in Edmonton, Canada. Exhibition elements included a 35-foot-tall rooftop cube made of lights that people could manipulate with their cellphones, a $2.5 million cube made of diamonds, a giant cube displaying the inner workings of the puzzle, and cube-solving robots. Google was LSC's creative partner in the creation of the 7,000-square-foot exhibition.

Hoffman is spearheading the development of SciTech Scity, a 30-acre innovation campus in Jersey City.

== Partial bibliography ==
- Hoffman, Paul (2007). King's Gambit: A Son, a Father, and the World's Most Dangerous Game. New York: Hyperion Books. ISBN 978-1-4013-0097-5.
- Hoffman, Paul (2003). Wings of Madness: Alberto Santos-Dumont and the Invention of Flight. Hyperion Books. ISBN 0-7868-8571-8.
- Hoffman, Paul (1998). The Man Who Loved Only Numbers: The Story of Paul Erdős and the Search for Mathematical Truth. New York: Hyperion Books. ISBN 0-7868-8406-1.
- Hoffman, Paul (1988). Archimedes' Revenge: The Joys and Perils of Mathematics. New York: Fawcett Colombine. ISBN 0-449-00089-3.
- Crypton, Dr. (1985). Timid Virgins Make Dull Company and Other Puzzles, Pitfalls, and Paradoxes. New York: Penguin Books. ISBN 0-14-008043-0.
