= Michael Saks (mathematician) =

American mathematician

Michael Ezra Saks is an American mathematician. He is currently the Department Chair of the Mathematics Department at Rutgers University (2017–) and from 2006 until 2010 was director of the Mathematics Graduate Program at Rutgers University. Saks received his Ph.D. from the Massachusetts Institute of Technology in 1980 after completing his dissertation titled Duality Properties of Finite Set Systems under his advisor Daniel J. Kleitman.

A list of his publications and collaborations may be found at DBLP.

In 2016 he became a Fellow of the Association for Computing Machinery.

== Research ==
Saks' research in computational complexity theory, combinatorics, and graph theory has contributed to the study of lower bounds in order theory, randomized computation, and space–time tradeoff.

In 1984, Saks and Jeff Kahn showed that there exist a tight information-theoretical lower bound for sorting under partially ordered information up to a multiplicative constant.

In the first super-linear lower bound for the noisy broadcast problem was proved. In a noisy broadcast model, $n+1$ processors $P_0,P_1,\ldots,P_n$ are assigned a local input bit $x_i$. Each processor may perform a noisy broadcast to all other processors where the received bits may be independently flipped with a fixed probability. The problem is for processor $P_0$ to determine $f(x_1,x_2,\ldots,x_n)$ for some function $f$. Saks et al. showed that an existing protocol by Gallager was indeed optimal by a reduction from a generalized noisy decision tree and produced a $\Omega(n\log(n))$ lower bound on the depth of the tree that learns the input.

In 2003, P. Beame, Saks, X. Sun, and E. Vee published the first time–space lower bound trade-off for randomized computation of decision problems was proved.

== Positions ==
Saks holds positions in the following journal editorial boards:

- SIAM Journal on Computing, Associate Editor
- Combinatorica, Editorial Board member
- Journal of Graph Theory, Editorial Board member
- Discrete Applied Mathematics, Editorial Board member

== Selected publications ==
- Borodin, Allan; Linial, Nathan; Saks, Michael E. (1992-10-01). "An optimal on-line algorithm for metrical task system". Journal of the ACM. 39 (4): 745–763. doi:10.1145/146585.146588. ISSN 0004-5411. S2CID 18783826.
- Fredman, M.; Saks, M. (1989-02-01). "The cell probe complexity of dynamic data structures". Proceedings of the twenty-first annual ACM symposium on Theory of computing - STOC '89. New York, NY, USA: Association for Computing Machinery. pp. 345–354. doi:10.1145/73007.73040. ISBN 978-0-89791-307-2. S2CID 13470414.
- Paturi, Ramamohan; Pudlák, Pavel; Saks, Michael E.; Zane, Francis (2005-05-01). "An improved exponential-time algorithm for k-SAT". Journal of the ACM. 52 (3): 337–364. doi:10.1145/1066100.1066101. ISSN 0004-5411.
- Goldberg, Andrew V.; Hartline, Jason D.; Karlin, Anna R.; Saks, Michael; Wright, Andrew (2006-05-01). "Competitive auctions". Games and Economic Behavior. Mini Special Issue: Electronic Market Design. 55 (2): 242–269. doi:10.1016/j.geb.2006.02.003. ISSN 0899-8256.
- Saks, Michael; Zaharoglou, Fotios (2000-01-01). "Wait-Free k-Set Agreement is Impossible: The Topology of Public Knowledge". SIAM Journal on Computing. 29 (5): 1449–1483. doi:10.1137/S0097539796307698. ISSN 0097-5397.
- Saks, Michael; Wigderson, Avi (October 1986). "Probabilistic Boolean decision trees and the complexity of evaluating game trees". 27th Annual Symposium on Foundations of Computer Science (SFCS 1986). pp. 29–38. doi:10.1109/SFCS.1986.44. ISBN 0-8186-0740-8. S2CID 6130392.
- Saks, Michael; Yu, Lan (2005-06-05). "Weak monotonicity suffices for truthfulness on convex domains". Proceedings of the 6th ACM conference on Electronic commerce. EC '05. New York, NY, USA: Association for Computing Machinery. pp. 286–293. doi:10.1145/1064009.1064040. ISBN 978-1-59593-049-1. S2CID 2135397.
