= Coherent algebra =

Algebra of complex square matrices

A coherent algebra is an algebra of complex square matrices that is closed under ordinary matrix multiplication, Schur product, transposition, and contains both the identity matrix $I$ and the all-ones matrix $J$.

== Definitions ==
A subspace $\mathcal{A}$ of $\mathrm{Mat}_{n \times n}(\mathbb{C})$ is said to be a coherent algebra of order $n$ if:

- $I, J \in \mathcal{A}$.
- $M^{T} \in \mathcal{A}$ for all $M \in \mathcal{A}$.
- $MN \in \mathcal{A}$ and $M \circ N \in \mathcal{A}$ for all $M, N \in \mathcal{A}$.

A coherent algebra $\mathcal{A}$ is said to be:

- Homogeneous if every matrix in $\mathcal{A}$ has a constant diagonal.
- Commutative if $\mathcal{A}$ is commutative with respect to ordinary matrix multiplication.
- Symmetric if every matrix in $\mathcal{A}$ is symmetric.

The set $\Gamma(\mathcal{A})$ of Schur-primitive matrices in a coherent algebra $\mathcal{A}$ is defined as $\Gamma(\mathcal{A}) := \{ M \in \mathcal{A} : M \circ M = M, M \circ N \in \operatorname{span} \{ M \} \text{ for all } N \in \mathcal{A} \}$.

Dually, the set $\Lambda(\mathcal{A})$ of primitive matrices in a coherent algebra $\mathcal{A}$ is defined as $\Lambda(\mathcal{A}) := \{ M \in \mathcal{A} : M^{2} = M, MN \in \operatorname{span} \{ M \} \text{ for all } N \in \mathcal{A} \}$.

== Examples ==
- The centralizer of a group of permutation matrices is a coherent algebra, i.e. $\mathcal{W}$ is a coherent algebra of order $n$ if $\mathcal{W} := \{ M \in \mathrm{Mat}_{n \times n}(\mathbb{C}) : MP = PM \text { for all } P \in S \}$ for a group $S$ of $n \times n$ permutation matrices. Additionally, the centralizer of the group of permutation matrices representing the automorphism group of a graph $G$ is homogeneous if and only if $G$ is vertex-transitive.
- The span of the set of matrices relating pairs of elements lying in the same orbit of a diagonal action of a finite group on a finite set is a coherent algebra, i.e. $\mathcal{W} := \operatorname{span} \{ A(u,v) : u,v \in V \}$ where $A(u,v) \in \operatorname{Mat}_{V \times V}(\mathbb{C})$ is defined as
  $$(A(u,v))_{x, y} := \begin{cases} 1 \ \text{if } (x, y) = (u^{g}, v^{g}) \text { for some } g \in G \\ 0 \text{ otherwise } \end{cases}$$
  for all $u, v \in V$ of a finite set $V$ acted on by a finite group $G$.
- The span of a regular representation of a finite group as a group of permutation matrices over $\mathbb{C}$ is a coherent algebra.

== Properties ==
- The intersection of a set of coherent algebras of order $n$ is a coherent algebra.
- The tensor product of coherent algebras is a coherent algebra, i.e. $\mathcal{A} \otimes \mathcal{B} := \{ M \otimes N : M \in \mathcal{A} \text{ and } N \in \mathcal{B} \}$ if $\mathcal{A} \in \operatorname{Mat}_{m \times m}(\mathbb{C})$ and $\mathcal{B} \in \mathrm{Mat}_{n \times n}(\mathbb{C})$ are coherent algebras.
- The symmetrization $\widehat{\mathcal{A}} := \operatorname{span} \{ M + M^{T} : M \in \mathcal{A} \}$ of a commutative coherent algebra $\mathcal{A}$ is a coherent algebra.
- If $\mathcal{A}$ is a coherent algebra, then $M^{T} \in \Gamma(\mathcal{A})$ for all $M \in \mathcal{A}$, $\mathcal{A} = \operatorname{span} \left ( \Gamma(\mathcal{A} \right ))$, and $I \in \Gamma(\mathcal{A})$ if $\mathcal{A}$ is homogeneous.
- Dually, if $\mathcal{A}$ is a commutative coherent algebra (of order $n$), then $E^{T}, E^{*} \in \Lambda(\mathcal{A})$ for all $E \in \mathcal{A}$, $\frac{1}{n} J \in \Lambda(\mathcal{A})$, and $\mathcal{A} = \operatorname{span} \left ( \Lambda(\mathcal{A} \right ))$ as well.
- Every symmetric coherent algebra is commutative, and every commutative coherent algebra is homogeneous.
- A coherent algebra is commutative if and only if it is the Bose–Mesner algebra of a (commutative) association scheme.
- A coherent algebra forms a principal ideal ring under Schur product; moreover, a commutative coherent algebra forms a principal ideal ring under ordinary matrix multiplication as well.

== See also ==
- Association scheme
- Bose–Mesner algebra
