= Basis of a matroid =

Maximal independent set of the matroid

In mathematics, a basis of a matroid is a maximal independent set of the matroid—that is, an independent set that is not contained in any other independent set.

== Examples ==
As an example, consider the matroid over the ground-set R^{2} (the vectors in the two-dimensional Euclidean plane), with the following independent sets:

{ {}, {(0,1)}, {(2,0)}, {(0,1),(2,0)}, {(0,3)}, {(0,3),(2,0)} }.

It has two bases, which are the sets {(0,1),(2,0)} , {(0,3),(2,0)}. These are the only independent sets that are maximal under inclusion.

The basis has a specialized name in several specialized kinds of matroids:

- In a graphic matroid, where the independent sets are the forests, the bases are called the spanning forests of the graph.
- In a transversal matroid, where the independent sets are endpoints of matchings in a given bipartite graph, the bases are called transversals.
- In a linear matroid, where the independent sets are the linearly-independent sets of vectors in a given vector-space, the bases are just called bases of the vector space. Hence, the concept of basis of a matroid generalizes the concept of basis from linear algebra.
- In a uniform matroid, where the independent sets are all sets with cardinality at most k (for some integer k), the bases are all sets with cardinality exactly k.
- In a partition matroid, where elements are partitioned into categories and the independent sets are all sets containing at most k_{c} elements from each category c, the bases are all sets which contain exactly k_{c} elements from category c.
- In a free matroid, where all subsets of the ground-set E are independent, the unique basis is E.

== Properties ==
=== Exchange ===
All matroids satisfy the following properties, for any two distinct bases $A$ and $B$:

- Basis-exchange property: if $a\in A\setminus B$, then there exists an element $b\in B\setminus A$ such that $(A \setminus \{ a \}) \cup \{b\}$ is a basis.
- Symmetric basis-exchange property: if $a\in A\setminus B$, then there exists an element $b\in B\setminus A$ such that both $(A \setminus \{ a \}) \cup \{b\}$ and $(B \setminus \{ b \}) \cup \{a\}$ are bases. Brualdi showed that it is in fact equivalent to the basis-exchange property.
- Multiple symmetric basis-exchange property: if $X\subseteq A\setminus B$, then there exists a subset $Y\subseteq B\setminus A$ such that both $(A \setminus X) \cup Y$ and $(B \setminus Y) \cup X$ are bases. Brylawski, Greene, and Woodall, showed (independently) that it is in fact equivalent to the basis-exchange property.
- Bijective basis-exchange property: There is a bijection $f$ from $A$ to $B$, such that for every $a\in A\setminus B$, $(A \setminus \{ a \}) \cup \{f(a)\}$ is a basis. Brualdi showed that it is equivalent to the basis-exchange property.
- Partition basis-exchange property: For each partition $(A_1, A_2, \ldots, A_m)$ of $A$ into m parts, there exists a partition $(B_1, B_2, \ldots, B_m)$ of $B$ into m parts, such that for every $i\in[m]$, $(A \setminus A_i) \cup B_i$ is a basis.

However, a basis-exchange property that is both symmetric and bijective is not satisfied by all matroids: it is satisfied only by base-orderable matroids.

In general, in the symmetric basis-exchange property, the element $b\in B\setminus A$ need not be unique. Regular matroids have the unique exchange property, meaning that for some $a\in A\setminus B$, the corresponding b is unique.

=== Cardinality ===
It follows from the basis exchange property that no member of $\mathcal{B}$ can be a proper subset of another.

Moreover, all bases of a given matroid have the same cardinality. In a linear matroid, the cardinality of all bases is called the dimension of the vector space.

=== Neil White's conjecture ===
It is conjectured that all matroids satisfy the following property: For every integer t ≥ 1, If B and B' are two t-tuples of bases with the same multi-set union, then there is a sequence of symmetric exchanges that transforms B to B'.

== Characterization ==
The bases of a matroid characterize the matroid completely: a set is independent if and only if it is a subset of a basis. Moreover, one may define a matroid $M$ to be a pair $(E,\mathcal{B})$, where $E$ is the ground-set and $\mathcal{B}$ is a collection of subsets of $E$, called "bases", with the following properties:

(B1) There is at least one base -- $\mathcal{B}$ is nonempty;

(B2) If $A$ and $B$ are distinct bases, and $a\in A\setminus B$, then there exists an element $b\in B\setminus A$ such that $(A \setminus \{ a \}) \cup \{b\}$ is a basis (this is the basis-exchange property).

(B2) implies that, given any two bases A and B, we can transform A into B by a sequence of exchanges of a single element. In particular, this implies that all bases must have the same cardinality.

== Duality ==
If $(E,\mathcal{B})$ is a finite matroid, we can define the orthogonal or dual matroid $(E,\mathcal{B}^*)$ by calling a set a basis in $\mathcal{B}^*$ if and only if its complement is in $\mathcal{B}$. It can be verified that $(E,\mathcal{B}^*)$ is indeed a matroid. The definition immediately implies that the dual of $(E,\mathcal{B}^*)$ is $(E,\mathcal{B})$.

Using duality, one can prove that the property (B2) can be replaced by the following:

(B2*) If $A$ and $B$ are distinct bases, and $b\in B\setminus A$, then there exists an element $a\in A\setminus B$ such that $(A \setminus \{ a \}) \cup \{b\}$ is a basis.

== Circuits ==
A dual notion to a basis is a circuit. A circuit in a matroid is a minimal dependent set—that is, a dependent set whose proper subsets are all independent. The terminology arises because the circuits of graphic matroids are cycles in the corresponding graphs.

One may define a matroid $M$ to be a pair $(E,\mathcal{C})$, where $E$ is the ground-set and $\mathcal{C}$ is a collection of subsets of $E$, called "circuits", with the following properties:

(C1) The empty set is not a circuit;
(C2) A proper subset of a circuit is not a circuit;
(C3) If C_{1} and C_{2} are distinct circuits, and x is an element in their intersection, then $(C_1 \cup C_2) \setminus \{x\}$ contains a circuit.

Another property of circuits is that, if a set $J$ is independent, and the set $J \cup \{x\}$ is dependent (i.e., adding the element $x$ makes it dependent), then $J \cup \{x\}$ contains a unique circuit $C(x,J)$, and it contains $x$. This circuit is called the fundamental circuit of $x$ w.r.t. $J$. It is analogous to the linear algebra fact, that if adding a vector $x$ to an independent vector set $J$ makes it dependent, then there is a unique linear combination of elements of $J$ that equals $x$.

== See also ==
- Matroid polytope - a polytope in R^{n} (where n is the number of elements in the matroid), whose vertices are indicator vectors of the bases of the matroid.
