= Ahlswede =

Ahlswede is a surname. Notable people with the surname include:

- Rudolf Ahlswede, German mathematician

== Other ==
- Ahlswede–Daykin inequality, Correlation-type inequality for four functions on a finite distributive lattice
- Ahlswede–Khachatrian theorem, Theorem in extremal set theory
