= Raj Chandra Bose =

Indian American mathematician and statistician (1901-1987)

- Raj Chandra Bose
- Born: 19 June 1901; Narmadapuram, Madhya Pradesh, India
- Died: 31 October 1987 (aged 86); Fort Collins, Colorado
- Citizenship: India
- Education: Rajabazar Science College (University of Calcutta)
- Known for: Association scheme Bose–Mesner algebra Euler's conjecture on Latin squares Strongly regular graphs Partial Geometries; Morse Code Notable Awards Elected Fellow of the US Academy of Sciences
- Awards: Elected Member of the US National Academy of Sciences
- Scientific career
- Fields: Mathematics and Statistics
- Workplaces: Indian Statistical Institute; Colorado State University; University of North Carolina at Chapel Hill
- Doctoral students: Dijen K. Ray-Chaudhuri; Sharadchandra Shankar Shrikhande; J. N. Srivastava

Raj Chandra Bose (or Basu) (19 June 1901 – 31 October 1987) was an Indian American mathematician and statistician best known for his work in design theory, finite geometry and the theory of error-correcting codes in which the class of BCH codes is partly named after him. He also invented the notions of partial geometry, association scheme, and strongly regular graph and started a systematic study of difference sets to construct symmetric block designs. He was notable for his work along with S. S. Shrikhande and E. T. Parker in their disproof of the famous conjecture made by Leonhard Euler dated 1782 that for no n do there exist two mutually orthogonal Latin squares of order 4n + 2.

== Early life ==
Bose was born in Hoshangabad, India into a Bengali family; he was the first of five children. His father was a physician and life was good until 1918 when his mother died in the influenza pandemic. His father died of a stroke the following year. Despite difficult circumstances, Bose continued to study securing first class in both the Masters examinations in Pure and Applied mathematics in 1925 and 1927 respectively at the Rajabazar Science College campus of University of Calcutta. His research was performed under the supervision of the geometry Professor Syamadas Mukhopadhyaya from Calcutta. Bose worked as a lecturer at Asutosh College, Calcutta. He published his work on the differential geometry of convex curves.

== Academic life ==
Bose's course changed in December 1932 when P. C. Mahalanobis, director of the new (1931) Indian Statistical Institute, offered Bose a part-time job. Mahalanobis had seen Bose's geometrical work and wanted him to work on statistics. The day after Bose moved in, the secretary brought him all the volumes of Biometrika with a list of 50 papers to read and also Ronald Fisher's Statistical Methods for Research Workers. Mahalanobis told him, "You were saying that you do not know much statistics. You master the 50 papers ... and Fisher's book. This will suffice for your statistical education for the present." With Samarendra Nath Roy, who joined the ISI a little later, Bose was the chief mathematician at the Institute.

He first worked with multivariate analysis where he collaborated with Mahalanobis and Roy. In 1938–39 Fisher visited India and talked about the design of experiments. Roy had the idea of using the theory of finite fields and finite geometry to solve problems in design. The development of a mathematical theory of design would be Bose's main preoccupation until the mid-1950s.

In 1935 Bose had become full-time at the Institute. In 1940 joined the University of Calcutta where C. R. Rao and H. K. Nandi were in the first group of students he taught. In 1945 Bose became Head of the Department of Statistics. University authorities in the United States told him he needed to have a doctorate. So he submitted his published papers on multivariate analysis and the design of experiments and was awarded a D. Litt. in 1947.

In 1947 Bose went to the United States as a visiting professor at Columbia University and the University of North Carolina at Chapel Hill. He received offers from American universities and he was also offered positions in India. The Indian jobs involved very heavy administration, which he saw as the end of his research work and in March 1949 he joined the University of North Carolina at Chapel Hill as Professor of Statistics.

In the years at Chapel Hill Bose made important discoveries on coding theory (with D.K. Ray-Chaudhuri) and constructed (with S. S. Shrikhande and E. T. Parker) a Graeco-Latin square of size 10, a counterexample to Euler's conjecture that no Graeco-Latin square of size 4k + 2 exists. In 1971, he retired at the age of 70. He then accepted a chair at Colorado State University of Fort Collins from which he retired in 1980. His final doctoral student finished after this second retirement.

Bose died in Colorado, aged 86, in 1987. He is survived by two daughters. The elder, Purabi Schur, is retired from the Library of Congress and the younger, Sipra Bose Johnson, is retired as a professor of anthropology from the State University of New York at New Paltz.

== Some articles by R. C. Bose ==
- R. C. Bose, On the construction of balanced incomplete block designs, Annals of Eugenics. 9 (1939), 358–399.
- R. C. Bose and K. R. Nair, Partially balanced incomplete block designs, Sankhya 4 (1939), 337–372.
- Bose, Raj Chandra; Mesner, D. M. (1959). "On linear associative algebras corresponding to association schemes of partially balanced designs". Annals of Mathematical Statistics. 30 (1): 21–38. doi:10.1214/aoms/1177706356. JSTOR 2237117. MR 0102157.
- R. C. Bose and S. S. Shrikhande, On the falsity of Euler's conjecture about the non-existence of two orthogonal Latin squares of order 4t + 2, Proceedings of the National Academy of Sciences USA, 45, (1959), 734–737.
- R. C. Bose and D.K. Ray-Chaudhuri On a class of error-correcting binary codes, Information and control, 3, (1960), 68–79.

== Some books by R. C. Bose ==
R. C. Bose and B. Manvel. Introduction to combinatorial theory. John Wiley & Sons, Inc., New York, 1984. ix+237 pp.

== Autobiography ==
- J. Gani (ed) (1982) The Making of Statisticians, New York: Springer-Verlag.

This has a chapter in which Bose tells the story of his life.

== Discussions ==
- Norman R. Draper (1990) Obituary: Raj Chandra Bose, Journal of the Royal Statistical Society Series A, Vol. 153, No. 1. pp. 98–99.
- "Bose, Raj Chandra", pp. 183–184 in Leading Personalities in Statistical Sciences from the Seventeenth Century to the Present, (ed. N. L. Johnson and S. Kotz) 1997. New York: Wiley. Originally published in Encyclopedia of Statistical Science.

== See also ==
- Association scheme
- Block design
- Bose–Mesner algebra
- Combinatorial design
- Design of experiments
