= Grassmann graph =

Class of simple graphs defined from vector spaces

- Named after: Hermann Grassmann
- Vertices: $\binom{n}{k}_q$
- Edges: $\frac{q [k]_q [n - k]_q}{2} \binom{n}{k}_q$
- Diameter: min(k, n − k)
- Properties: Distance-transitive; Connected
- Notation: J_{q}(n,k)

In graph theory, Grassmann graphs are a special class of simple graphs defined from systems of subspaces. The vertices of the Grassmann graph J_{q}(n, k) are the k-dimensional subspaces of an n-dimensional vector space over a finite field of order q; two vertices are adjacent when their intersection is (k − 1)-dimensional.

Many of the parameters of Grassmann graphs are q-analogs of the parameters of Johnson graphs, and Grassmann graphs have several of the same graph properties as Johnson graphs.

== Graph-theoretic properties ==
- J_{q}(n, k) is isomorphic to J_{q}(n, n − k).
- For all 0 ≤ d ≤ diam(J_{q}(n,k)), the intersection of any pair of vertices at distance d is (k − d)-dimensional.
- The clique number of J_{q}(n,k) is given by an expression in terms its least and greatest eigenvalues λ_{min} and λ_{max}:

$\omega \left( J_q(n,k) \right) = 1 - \frac{\lambda_{\max}}{\lambda_{\min}}$

== Automorphism group ==
There is a distance-transitive subgroup of $\operatorname{Aut}(J_q(n, k))$ isomorphic to the projective linear group $\operatorname{P\Gamma L}(n, q)$.

In fact, unless $n = 2k$ or $k \in \{ 1, n - 1 \}$, $\operatorname{Aut}(J_q(n,k)) \cong \operatorname{P\Gamma L}(n, q)$; otherwise $\operatorname{Aut}(J_q(n,k)) \cong \operatorname{P\Gamma L}(n, q) \times C_2$ or $\operatorname{Aut}(J_q(n,k)) \cong \operatorname{Sym}([n]_q)$ respectively.

== Intersection array ==
As a consequence of being distance-transitive, $J_q(n,k)$ is also distance-regular. Letting $d$ denote its diameter, the intersection array of $J_q(n,k)$ is given by $\left\{ b_0, \ldots, b_{d-1}; c_1, \ldots c_d \right \}$ where:

- $b_j := q^{2j + 1} [k - j]_q [n - k - j]_q$ for all $0 \leq j < d$.
- $c_j := ([j]_q)^2$ for all $0 < j \leq d$.

== Spectrum ==
- The characteristic polynomial of $J_q(n,k)$ is given by

$\varphi(x) := \prod\limits_{j=0}^{\operatorname{diam}(J_q(n, k))} \left ( x - \left ( q^{j+1} [k - j]_q [n - k - j]_q - [j]_q \right ) \right )^{\left ( \binom{n}{j}_q - \binom{n}{j-1}_q \right )}$.

== See also ==
- Grassmannian
- Johnson graph
