= Ke Zhao =

Chinese mathematician (1910–2002)

Ke Zhao or Chao Ko (Chinese: 柯召; pinyin: Kē Zhào; Wade–Giles: K'o Chao, April 12, 1910 – November 8, 2002) was a Chinese mathematician born in Wenling, Taizhou, Zhejiang.

== Biography ==
Ke graduated from Tsinghua University in 1933 and obtained his doctorate from the University of Manchester under Louis Mordell in 1937. His main fields of study were algebra, number theory and combinatorics. Some of his major contributions included his work on quadratic forms, the Erdős–Ko–Rado theorem and his theorem on Catalan's conjecture. In 1955, he was one of the founding members of the Chinese Academy of Sciences. He was later a professor at Sichuan University and became the president of the university and of the Chinese Mathematical Society.
