= Bose–Mesner algebra =

In mathematics, a Bose–Mesner algebra is a special set of matrices which arise from a combinatorial structure known as an association scheme, together with the usual set of rules for combining (forming the products of) those matrices, such that they form an associative algebra, or, more precisely, a unitary commutative algebra. Among these rules are:

- the result of a product is also within the set of matrices,
- there is an identity matrix in the set, and
- taking products is commutative.

Bose–Mesner algebras have applications in physics to spin models, and in statistics to the design of experiments. They are named for R. C. Bose and Dale Marsh Mesner.

== Definition ==
Let X be a set of v elements. Consider a partition of the 2-element subsets of X into n non-empty subsets, R_{1}, ..., R_{n}, such that:

- given an $x \in X$, the number of $y \in X$ such that $\{x,y\} \in R_i$ depends only on i (and not on x). This number will be denoted by v_{i}, and
- given $x,y \in X$ with $\{x,y\} \in R_k$, the number of $z \in X$ such that $\{x,z\} \in R_i$ and $\{z,y\} \in R_j$ depends only on i,j and k (and not on x and y). This number will be denoted by $p^k_{ij}$.

This structure is enhanced by adding all pairs of repeated elements of X and collecting them in a subset R_{0}. This enhancement permits the parameters i, j, and k to take on the value of zero, and lets some of x,y or z be equal. A set with such an enhanced partition is called an association scheme.

A symmetric association scheme is one in which each $R_i$ is a symmetric relation. That is:

- if (x, y) ∈ R_{i}, then (y, x) ∈ R_{i}. (Or equivalently, R_{i}^{T} = R_{i}.)

An association scheme is commutative if $p_{ij}^k = p_{ji}^k$ for all $i$, $j$ and $k$. These two properties are closely related, as every symmetric association scheme is commutative.

It is important to keep in mind that there is some ambiguity when coming across the term "association scheme" in the literature, as some authors use it synonymously with "symmetric association scheme" and "commutative association scheme". Therefore, one should always verify whether R_{i}^{T} = R_{i} or $p^k_{ij} = p^k_{ji}$ is taken axiomatically in order to help avoid any potential confusion. The remainder of this article will assume that the association scheme is symmetric, which would imply that the association scheme is also commutative.

One may view an association scheme as a partition of the edges of a complete graph (with vertex set X) into n classes, often thought of as color classes. In this representation, there is a loop at each vertex and all the loops receive the same 0th color.

The association scheme can also be represented algebraically. Consider the matrices D_{i} defined by:

$$(D_i)_{x,y} = \begin{cases}
1,& \text{if } \left(x,y\right)\in R_{i},\\
0,& \text{otherwise.}  \end{cases} \qquad (1)$$

Let $\mathcal{A}$ be the vector space consisting of all matrices $\sideset{}{_{i=0}^{n}}\sum a_{i}D_{i}$, with $a_{i}$ complex.

The definition of an association scheme is equivalent to saying that the $D_{i}$ are $v \times v$ (0,1)-matrices which satisfy

1. $D_i$ is symmetric,
2. $\sum_{i=0}^n D_{i}=J$ (the all-ones matrix),
3. $D_0=I,$
4. $D_i D_j = \sum_{k=0}^n p^k_{ij} D_k = D_j D_i,\qquad i,j=0,\ldots,n.$

The (x,y)-th entry of the left side of 4. is the number of two colored paths of length two joining x and y (using "colors" i and j) in the graph. Note that the rows and columns of $D_i$ contain $v_i$ 1s:

$$D_i J=J D_i = v_i J. \qquad (2)$$

From 1., these matrices are symmetric. From 2., $D_{0},\ldots,D_{n}$ are linearly independent, and the dimension of $\mathcal{A}$ is $n+1$. From 4., $\mathcal{A}$ is closed under multiplication, and multiplication is always associative. This associative commutative algebra $\mathcal{A}$ is called the Bose–Mesner algebra of the association scheme. Since the matrices in $\mathcal{A}$ are symmetric and commute with each other, they can be simultaneously diagonalized. This means that there is a matrix $S$ such that to each $A\in\mathcal{A}$ there is a diagonal matrix $\Lambda_{A}$ with $S^{-1}A S=\Lambda_{A}$. This means that $\mathcal{A}$ is semi-simple and has a unique basis of primitive idempotents $J_{0},\ldots,J_{n}$. These are complex n × n matrices satisfying

$$J_i^2 =J_i, i=0,\ldots,n, \qquad (3)$$

$$J_i J_k=0, i\neq k, \qquad (4)$$

$$\sum_{i=0}^n J_i = I. \qquad (5)$$

The Bose–Mesner algebra has two distinguished bases: the basis consisting of the adjacency matrices $D_i$, and the basis consisting of the irreducible idempotent matrices $J_k$. By definition, there exist well-defined complex numbers such that

$$D_{i}=\sum_{k=0}^n p_i (k) J_k, \qquad (6)$$

and

$$|X|J_{k}=\sum_{i=0}^n q_k\left(i\right)D_i. \qquad (7)$$

The p-numbers $p_i (k)$, and the q-numbers $q_k(i)$, play a prominent role in the theory. They satisfy well-defined orthogonality relations. The p-numbers are the eigenvalues of the adjacency matrix $D_i$.

== Theorem ==
The eigenvalues of $p_i(k)$ and $q_k(i)$, satisfy the orthogonality conditions:

$$\sum_{k=0}^n \mu_i p_i (k)p_\ell (k)=v v_i \delta_{i \ell}, \quad(8)$$

$$\sum_{k=0}^n \mu_i q_k (i) q_\ell (i)=v \mu_k \delta_{k \ell}. \quad(9)$$

Also

$$\mu_j p_i (j) = v_i q_ j (i),\quad i,j=0,\ldots,n. \quad(10)$$

In matrix notation, these are

$$P^T \Delta_\mu P=v\Delta_v, \quad(11)$$

$$Q^T \Delta_v Q=v\Delta_\mu, \quad(12)$$

where $\Delta_v = \operatorname{diag} \{v_0,v_1,\ldots,v_n\},\qquad \Delta_\mu = \operatorname{diag} \{\mu_0,\mu_1,\ldots,\mu_n\}.$

== Proof of theorem ==
The eigenvalues of $D_i D_\ell$ are $p_i (k)p_\ell (k)$ with multiplicities $\mu_k$. This implies that

$$v v_i \delta_{i\ell} = \operatorname{trace}D_i D_\ell = \sum_{k=0}^n \mu_i p_i(k) p_\ell (k), \quad(13)$$

which proves Equation $\left(8\right)$ and Equation $\left(11\right)$,

$$Q = v P^{-1} = \Delta_v^{-1} P^T \Delta_\mu, \quad(14)$$

which gives Equations $(9)$, $(10)$ and $(12)$.$\Box$

There is an analogy between extensions of association schemes and extensions of finite fields. The cases we are most interested in are those where the extended schemes are defined on the $n$-th Cartesian power $X=\mathcal{F}^{n}$ of a set $\mathcal{F}$ on which a basic association scheme $\left(\mathcal{F},K\right)$ is defined. A first association scheme defined on $X=\mathcal{F}^{n}$ is called the $n$-th Kronecker power $\left(\mathcal{F},K\right)_{\otimes}^{n}$ of $\left(\mathcal{F},K\right)$. Next the extension is defined on the same set $X=\mathcal{F}^{n}$ by gathering classes of $\left(\mathcal{F},K\right)_{\otimes}^{n}$. The Kronecker power corresponds to the polynomial ring $F\left[X\right]$ first defined on a field $\mathbb{F}$, while the extension scheme corresponds to the extension field obtained as a quotient. An example of such an extended scheme is the Hamming scheme.

Association schemes may be merged, but merging them leads to non-symmetric association schemes, whereas all usual codes are subgroups in symmetric Abelian schemes.

== See also ==
- Association scheme
