= Ahlswede–Khachatrian theorem =

Theorem in extremal set theory

In extremal set theory, the Ahlswede–Khachatrian theorem generalizes the Erdős–Ko–Rado theorem to t-intersecting families. Given parameters n, k and t, it describes the maximum size of a t-intersecting family of subsets of $\{1,\dots,n\}$ of size k, as well as the families achieving the maximum size.

== Statement ==
Let $n \ge k \ge t \ge 1$ be integer parameters. A t-intersecting family $\cal F$ is a collection of subsets of $\{1,\dots,n\}$ of size k such that if $A,B \in \cal F$ then $|A\cap B| \ge t$. Frankl constructed the t-intersecting families

$$\mathcal{F}_{n,k,t,r} = \{ A \subseteq \{1,\dots,n\} : |A|=k \text{ and } |A \cap \{1,\dots,t+2r\}| \ge t+r \}.$$

The Ahlswede–Khachatrian theorem states that if $\cal F$ is t-intersecting then

$$|{\cal F}| \leq \max_{r\colon t+2r \leq n} |\mathcal{F}_{n,k,t,r}|.$$

Furthermore, equality is possible only if $\cal F$ is equivalent to a Frankl family, meaning that it coincides with one after permuting the coordinates.

More explicitly, if

$$(k-t+1)(2+\tfrac{t-1}{r+1}) < n < (k-t+1)(2+\tfrac{t-1}{r})$$

(where the upper bound is ignored when $r=0$) then $|\mathcal{F}| \leq |\mathcal{F}_{n,k,t,r}|$, with equality if and only if $\cal F$ is equivalent to $\mathcal{F}_{n,k,t,r}$; and if

$$(k-t+1)(2+\tfrac{t-1}{r+1}) = n$$

then $|\mathcal{F}| \leq |\mathcal{F}_{n,k,t,r}| = |\mathcal{F}_{n,k,t,r+1}|$, with equality if and only if $\cal F$ is equivalent to $\mathcal{F}_{n,k,t,r}$ or to $\mathcal{F}_{n,k,t,r+1}$.

== History ==
Erdős, Ko and Rado showed that if $n \ge t + (k-t) \binom{k}{t}^2$ then the maximum size of a t-intersecting family is $|\mathcal{F}_{n,k,t,0}| = \binom{n-t}{k-t}$. Frankl proved that when $t \ge 15$, the same bound holds for all $n \ge (t+1)(k-t-1)$, which is tight due to the example $\mathcal{F}_{n,k,t,1}$. This was extended to all t (using completely different techniques) by Wilson.

As for smaller n, Erdős, Ko and Rado made the $4m$ conjecture, which states that when $(n,k,t)=(4m,2m,2)$, the maximum size of a t-intersecting family is

$$|\{ A \subseteq \{1,\ldots,4m\} : |A|=2m \text{ and } |A \cap \{1,\ldots,2m\}| \ge m+1 \}|,$$

which coincides with the size of the Frankl family $\mathcal{F}_{4m,2m,2,m-1}$. This conjecture is a special case of the Ahlswede–Khachatrian theorem.

Ahlswede and Khachatrian proved their theorem in two different ways: using generating sets and using its dual. Using similar techniques, they later proved the corresponding Hilton–Milner theorem, which determines the maximum size of a t-intersecting family with the additional condition that no element is contained in all sets of the family.

== Related results ==
=== Weighted version ===
Katona's intersection theorem determines the maximum size of an intersecting family of subsets of $\{1,\dots,n\}$. When ${{{1}}}$ is odd, the unique optimal family consists of all sets of size at least $m+1$ (corresponding to the Majority function), and when ${{{1}}}$ is odd, the unique optimal families consist of all sets whose intersection with a fixed set of size $2m-1$ is at least $m-1$ (Majority on $2m-1$ coordinates).

Friedgut considered a measure-theoretic generalization of Katona's theorem, in which instead of maximizing the size of the intersecting family, we maximize its $\mu_p$-measure, where $\mu_p$ is given by the formula

$$\mu_p(S) = p^{|S|} (1-p)^{n-|S|}.$$

The measure $\mu_p$ corresponds to the process which chooses a random subset of $\{1,\dots,n\}$ by adding each element with probability p independently.

Katona's intersection theorem is the case ${{{1}}}$. Friedgut considered the case $p<1/2$. The weighted analog of the Erdős–Ko–Rado theorem states that if $\cal F$ is intersecting then $\mu_p(\cal F) \leq p$ for all $p < 1/2$, with equality if and only if $\cal F$ consists of all sets containing a fixed point. Friedgut proved the analog of Wilson's result in this setting: if $\cal F$ is t-intersecting then $\mu_p(\cal F) \leq p^t$ for all $p < 1/(t+1)$, with equality if and only if $\cal F$ consists of all sets containing t fixed points. Friedgut's techniques are similar to Wilson's.

Dinur and Safra and Ahlswede and Khachatrian observed that the Ahlswede–Khachatrian theorem implies its own weighted version, for all $p < 1/2$. To state the weighted version, we first define the analogs of the Frankl families:

$$\mathcal{F}_{n,t,r} = \{ A \subseteq \{1,\dots,n\} : |A \cap \{1,\dots,t+2r\}| \ge t+r \}.$$

The weighted Ahlswede–Khachatrian theorem states that if $\cal F$ is t-intersecting then for all $0 < p < 1$,

$$\mu_p(\mathcal{F}) \leq \max_{r\colon t+2r \leq n} \mu_p(\mathcal{F}_{n,t,r}),$$

with equality only if $\cal F$ is equivalent to a Frankl family. Explicitly, $\mathcal{F}_{n,t,r}$ is optimal in the range

$$\frac{r}{t+2r-1} \leq p \leq \frac{r+1}{t+2r+1}.$$

The argument of Dinur and Safra proves this result for all $p<1/2$, without the characterization of the optimal cases. The main idea is that if we take a random subset of $\{1,\dots,N\}$ of size $\lfloor pN \rfloor$, then the distribution of its intersection with $\{1,\ldots,n\}$ tends to $\mu_p$ as $N\to\infty$.

Filmus proved weighted Ahlswede–Khachatrian theorem for all $n,t,p$ using the original arguments of Ahlswede and Khachatrian for $p<1/2$, and using a different argument of Ahlswede and Khachatrian, originally used to provide an alternative proof of Katona's theorem, for $p\ge1/2$. He also showed that the Frankl families are the unique optimal families for all $n,t,p$.

=== Version for strings ===
Ahlswede and Khachatrian proved a version of the Ahlswede–Khachatrian theorem for strings over a finite alphabet. Given a finite alphabet $\Sigma$, a collection of strings of length n is t-intersecting if any two strings in the collection agree in at least t places. The analogs of the Frankl family in this setting are

$$\mathcal{F}_{n,t,r} = \{ w \in \Sigma^n : |w \cap w_0| \ge t+r \},$$

where $w_0 \in \Sigma^n$ is an arbitrary word, and $|w \cap w_0|$ is the number of positions in which w and $w_0$ agree.

The Ahlswede–Khachatrian theorem for strings states that if $\cal F$ is t-intersecting then

$$|\mathcal{F}| \leq \max_{r\colon t+2r \leq n} |\mathcal{F}_{n,t,r}|,$$

with equality if and only if $\cal F$ is equivalent to a Frankl family.

The theorem is proved by a reduction to the weighted Ahlswede–Khachatrian theorem, with $p=1/|\Sigma|$.
