= Hamming scheme =

The Hamming scheme, named after Richard Hamming, also known as the hyper-cubic association scheme, is the most important example in coding theory. In this scheme $X=\mathcal{F}^n,$ the set of binary vectors of length $n,$ and two vectors $x, y\in \mathcal{F}^n$ are $i$-th associates if they are Hamming distance $i$ apart.

Recall that an association scheme is visualized as a complete graph with labeled edges. The graph has $v$ vertices, one for each point of $X,$ and the edge joining vertices $x$ and $y$ is labeled $i$ if $x$ and $y$ are $i$-th associates. Each edge has a unique label, and the number of triangles with a fixed base labeled $k$ having the other edges labeled $i$ and $j$ is a constant $c_{ijk},$ depending on $i,j,k$ but not on the choice of the base. In particular, each vertex is incident with exactly $c_{ii0}=v_i$ edges labeled $i$; $v_{i}$ is the valency of the relation $R_i.$ The $c_{ijk}$ in a Hamming scheme are given by

$$c_{ijk} = \begin{cases} \dbinom{k}{\frac{1}{2}(i-j+k)} \dbinom{n-k}{\frac{1}{2}(i+j-k)} & i+j-k \equiv 0 \pmod 2 \\ \\ 0& i+j-k \equiv 1 \pmod 2 \end{cases}$$

Here, $v=|X|=2^n$ and $v_i=\tbinom{n}{i}.$ The matrices in the Bose-Mesner algebra are $2^n\times 2^n$ matrices, with rows and columns labeled by vectors $x\in \mathcal{F}^n.$ In particular the $(x,y)$-th entry of $D_{k}$ is $1$ if and only if $d_{H}(x,y)=k.$

== See also ==
- Richard Hamming
- Association scheme
- Hamming distance
- Bose–Mesner algebra
- Coding theory
