= Johnson scheme =

In mathematics, the Johnson scheme, named after Selmer M. Johnson, is also known as the triangular association scheme. It consists of the set of all binary vectors X of length ℓ and weight n, such that $v=\left|X\right|=\binom{\ell}{n}$. Two vectors x, y ∈ X are called ith associates if dist(x, y) = 2i for i = 0, 1, ..., n. The eigenvalues are given by

$$p_{i}\left(k\right)=E_{i}\left(k\right),$$

$$q_{k}\left(i\right)=\frac{\mu_{k}}{v_{i}}E_{i}\left(k\right),$$

where

$$\mu_{i}=\frac{\ell-2i+1}{\ell-i+1}\binom{\ell}{i},$$

and E_{k}(x) is an Eberlein polynomial defined by

$$E_{k}\left(x\right)=\sum_{j=0}^{k}(-1)^{j}\binom{x}{j} \binom{n-x}{k-j}\binom{\ell-n-x}{k-j},\qquad k=0,\ldots,n.$$
