= Indicator vector =

In mathematics, the indicator vector, characteristic vector, or incidence vector of a subset T of a set S is the vector $x_T := (x_s)_{s\in S}$ such that $x_s = 1$ if $s \in T$ and $x_s = 0$ if $s \notin T.$

If S is countable and its elements are numbered so that $S = \{s_1,s_2,\ldots,s_n\}$, then $x_T = (x_1,x_2,\ldots,x_n)$ where $x_i = 1$ if $s_i \in T$ and $x_i = 0$ if $s_i \notin T.$

To put it more simply, the indicator vector of T is a vector with one element for each element in S, with that element being one if the corresponding element of S is in T, and zero if it is not.

An indicator vector is a special (countable) case of an indicator function.

== Example ==
If S is the set of natural numbers $\mathbb{N}$, and T is some subset of the natural numbers, then the indicator vector is naturally a single point in the Cantor space: that is, an infinite sequence of 1's and 0's, indicating membership, or lack thereof, in T. Such vectors commonly occur in the study of arithmetical hierarchy.
