= Richard Montgomery (mathematician) =

British mathematician

- Born: 1990 (age 35–36)
- Education: University of Cambridge
- Awards: European Prize in Combinatorics (2019); Philip Leverhulme Prize (2020); EMS Prize (2024); Whitehead Prize (2025); Adams Prize (2026)
- Scientific career
- Fields: Combinatorics
- Workplaces: University of Warwick; University of Birmingham; Trinity College, Cambridge
- Thesis: Minors and Spanning Trees in Graphs (2015)
- Doctoral advisor: Andrew Thomason

Richard Montgomery (born 1990) is a British mathematician and professor at the University of Warwick. His research is principally in extremal and probabilistic combinatorics.

== Education and career ==
Montgomery studied at the University of Cambridge, receiving a BA and MMath in 2011 and completing his PhD in 2015 under the supervision of Andrew Thomason. His thesis was titled Minors and Spanning Trees in Graphs.

He was a postdoctoral fellow at the University of Birmingham in 2015 and a Junior Research Fellow at Trinity College, Cambridge, from 2015 to 2019. At Birmingham, he was a Birmingham Fellow from 2018 to 2020, a Senior Birmingham Fellow from 2020 to 2021 and a reader in combinatorics from 2021 to 2022. In 2022 he joined the University of Warwick as an associate professor. He became a reader there in 2024 and a full professor in 2025.

== Research ==
Montgomery works on extremal and probabilistic combinatorics, particularly problems concerning subgraphs, graph decompositions and random graphs.

He resolved a conjecture of Jeff Kahn about spanning trees in random graphs. Montgomery proved that, for every fixed $\Delta>0$, there is a constant $C=C(\Delta)$ such that the binomial random graph $G(n,C\log n/n)$ contains a copy of every tree on $n$ vertices with maximum degree at most $\Delta$, with high probability.

With Alexey Pokrovskiy and Benny Sudakov, Montgomery studied decompositions of edge-coloured complete bipartite graphs into rainbow perfect matchings, which correspond to decompositions of Latin squares into transversals. They also proved that every properly edge-coloured complete graph can be nearly decomposed into rainbow spanning trees.

The same authors proved Ringel's conjecture for all sufficiently large $n$. The conjecture, posed by Gerhard Ringel in 1963, states that, for every tree $T$ with $n$ edges, the edges of the complete graph $K_{2n+1}$ can be decomposed into $2n+1$ copies of $T$.

With Hong Liu, Montgomery solved a problem posed by Paul Erdős and András Hajnal in 1981 concerning the odd cycle lengths of graphs with infinite chromatic number. They proved an asymptotically sharp lower bound on the sum of the reciprocals of the odd cycle lengths in a graph in terms of its chromatic number.

In 2023, Montgomery proved the Ryser–Brualdi–Stein conjecture for all sufficiently large even $n$. This conjecture states that every Latin square of even order $n$ has a transversal containing $n-1$ cells.

== Awards and honours ==
Together with Alexey Pokrovskiy, Montgomery received the 2019 European Prize in Combinatorics. The prize recognised their "deep contributions to extremal and probabilistic combinatorics".

In 2020, Montgomery received a Philip Leverhulme Prize.

The European Mathematical Society awarded him an EMS Prize in 2024, citing his work on Ringel's conjecture, distributive absorption and sublinear expanders.

In 2025, he received a Whitehead Prize from the London Mathematical Society for his work on the absorption method and sublinear expanders in extremal and probabilistic combinatorics.

In 2026, Montgomery and Julian Sahasrabudhe jointly received the Adams Prize for work in discrete mathematics.

== Selected publications ==
- Montgomery, Richard; Pokrovskiy, Alexey; Sudakov, Benny (2019). "Decompositions into spanning rainbow structures". Proceedings of the London Mathematical Society. 119 (4): 899–959. arXiv:1805.07564. doi:10.1112/plms.12245.
- Montgomery, Richard (2019). "Spanning trees in random graphs". Advances in Mathematics. 356 106793. arXiv:1810.03299. doi:10.1016/j.aim.2019.106793.
- Montgomery, Richard; Pokrovskiy, Alexey; Sudakov, Benny (2021). "A proof of Ringel's conjecture". Geometric and Functional Analysis. 31 (3): 663–720. arXiv:2001.02665. doi:10.1007/s00039-021-00576-2.
- Liu, Hong; Montgomery, Richard (2023). "A solution to Erdős and Hajnal's odd cycle problem". Journal of the American Mathematical Society. 36 (4): 1191–1234. arXiv:2010.15802. doi:10.1090/jams/1018.
- Montgomery, Richard (2023). "A proof of the Ryser–Brualdi–Stein conjecture for large even n". arXiv:2310.19779 [math.CO].
