= Loh =

Loh may refer to:

People

- Betty Loh Ti (1937–1968), Chinese actress
- Christine Loh Kung-wai, Hong Kong university professor
- John M. Loh (born 1938), USAF Chief of Staff
- Po-Ling Loh (born 1987), American statistician, daughter of Wei-Yin, sister of Po-Shen
- Po-Shen Loh (born 1982), American mathematician, son of Wei-Yin, brother of Po-Ling
- Wei-Yin Loh, Singaporean statistician, father of Po-Shen and Po-Ling
- Loh Boon Siew (1915–1995), Penangite businessman
- Loh (Ramayana) in Hindu mythology
- Valerie Solanas, aka Onz Loh, U.S. writer
- Sandra Tsing Loh (born 1962), US writer
- Loh Kean Yew, Singaporean badminton player

Places

- A locality of Affoltern am Albis, Zürich, Switzerland
- A misspelling of Lo Island, Vanuatu

Others

- Loh Kooi Choon v Malaysia (1977), a legal case about the constitution
- A variant spelling of the Chinese surname, Luó (simplified Chinese: 罗; traditional Chinese: 羅)
- A variant spelling of the Chinese surname, Lú (simplified Chinese: 卢; traditional Chinese: 盧)
- A variant spelling of the Chinese surname, Luò (simplified Chinese: 骆; traditional Chinese: 駱)

LOH may refer to:

- Loss of heterozygosity in genetics
- Light Observation Helicopter, US
- HAL Light Observation Helicopter
- Lostock Hall railway station, England, National Rail code
- Ciudad de Catamayo Airport, Loja, Ecuador, IATA code
- Late-onset hypogonadism, a medical condition
- length of hull is used in small boats (ISO 8666). This may be shorter than a vessel's Length overall (LOA), because it excludes other parts attached to the hull, such as bowsprits.
