= József Balogh (mathematician) =

Hungarian mathematician

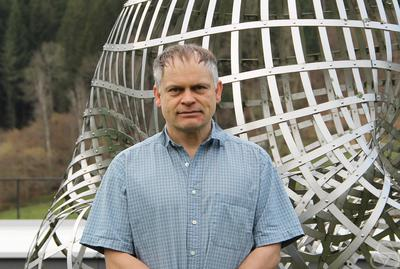
- Balogh at Oberwolfach in 2023
- Born: December 1971 (age 54); Hungary
- Scientific career
- Fields: Mathematics; Combinatorics; Graph theory
- Workplaces: University of Illinois at Urbana–Champaign
- Doctoral advisor: Béla Bollobás
- Doctoral students: Wojciech Samotij
- Website: sites.google.com/view/jozsefbaloghmath

József Balogh is a Hungarian-American mathematician, specializing in graph theory and combinatorics.

== Education and career ==
Balogh grew up in Mórahalom and attended secondary school in Szeged at Ságvári Endre Gyakorló Gimnázium (a special school for mathematics). As a student, he won two silver medals (in 1989 and 1990) at the International Mathematical Olympiad. He studied at the University of Szeged (with one year TEMPUS grant at the University of Ghent), where he received his M.S, in mathematics in 1995 with advisor Péter Hajnal and thesis On the existence of MDS-cyclic codes. In 2001 Balogh received his doctorate from the University of Memphis with advisor Béla Bollobás and thesis Graph properties and Bootstrap percolation. As a postdoc Balogh was at AT&T Shannon Laboratories in Florham Park, New Jersey and for several months in 2002 at the Institute for Advanced Study. From 2002 to 2005 he was Zassenhaus Assistant Professor at Ohio State University. At the University of Illinois at Urbana–Champaign he was an assistant professor from 2005 to 2010 and an associate professor from 2010 to 2013 and is since 2013 a full professor. From 2009 to 2011 he was also an associate professor at University of California, San Diego.

Balogh's research deals with extremal and probabilistic combinatorics (especially graph theory) and bootstrap percolation. The latter models the spread of an infection on a d-dimensional grid, whereby nodes are infected in each time step in which at least r neighbors have already been infected. It is based on a randomly chosen starting structure and Bollobás, Balogh, Hugo Duminil-Copin and Robert Morris proved an asymptotic (for large grids) formula for the threshold probability that the whole grid is infected, depending on d and r. He had previously treated the three-dimensional case with r = 3 with Bollobás and Morris.

== Recognition ==
In 2007, he received an NSF Career Grant. In 2013/14 and 2020 he was a Simons Fellow, in 2013/14 Marie Curie Fellow. In 2016 he received the George Pólya Prize in combinatorics with Robert Morris and Wojciech Samotij. In 2018 Balogh was an invited speaker at the International Congress of Mathematicians in Rio de Janeiro.

He was named to the 2023 class of Fellows of the American Mathematical Society, "for contributions to extremal combinatorics, probability and additive number theory, and for graduate mentoring". In 2024 he was awarded the Leroy P. Steele Prize for Seminal Contribution to Research jointly with Robert Morris and Wojciech Samotij.

== Selected publications ==
- with Noga Alon, Peter Keevash, Benny Sudakov: The number of edge colorings with no monochromatic cliques, J. London Math. Soc., vol. 70, 2004, pp. 273–288. pdf
- with B. Bollobas, Robert Morris: Bootstrap percolation in three dimensions. Annals of Probability, vol. 37, 2009, pp. 1329–1380. Arxiv
- with Wojtek Samotij: The number of $K_{s,t}$-free graphs, J. Lond. Math. Soc., vol. 83, 2011, pp. 368–388, Abstract
- with John Lenz: Some Exact Ramsey-Turan Numbers, Bull. Lond. Math. Soc., vol. 44, 2012, pp. 1251–1258. Arxiv
- with Bela Bollobas, Hugo Duminil-Copin, R. Morris: The sharp threshold for bootstrap percolation in all dimensions, Trans. Amer. Math. Soc., vol. 364 2012, pp. 2667–2701. Arxiv
- with N. Alon, R. Morris, W. Samotij: A refinement of the Cameron-Erdös Conjecture, Proc. London Mathematical Society, vol. 108, 2014, pp. 44–72. Arxiv
- with Sarka Petrickova: The number of the maximal triangle-free graphs, Bull. London Math. Soc., vol. 46, 2014, pp. 1003–1006. Arxiv
- with Morris, Samotij: Independent sets in hypergraphs, J. AMS, vol. 28, 2015, pp. 669–709, Arxiv 2012
- with Hong Liu, Maryam Sharifzadeh, Andrew Treglown: The number of maximal sum-free subsets of integers, Proc. AMS, vol. 143, 2015, pp. 4713–4721, Arxiv 2014
- with J. Solymosi, On the number of points in general position in the plane, Discrete Analysis (2018), Paper No. 16, 20 pp.
- with R. Morris, W. Samotij, L. Warnke: The typical structure of sparse $K_{r+1}$-free graphs., Transactions AMS, 368 (2016) 6439–6485.Arxiv 2013
