= Lisa Sauermann =

German mathematician (born 1992)

- Sauermann at Oberwolfach, 2026
- Born: 25 September 1992 (age 34); Dresden, Saxony
- Education: University of Bonn; Stanford University
- Scientific career
- Fields: Mathematics
- Thesis: Modern Methods in Extremal Combinatorics (2019)
- Doctoral advisor: Jacob Fox
- Website: www.iam.uni-bonn.de/users/sauermann/home

Lisa Sauermann (born 25 September 1992) is a German mathematician known for her performance in the International Mathematical Olympiad, where in 2011 she had the single highest (and perfect) score. She won four gold medals (2008–2011) and one silver medal (2007) at the Olympiad, representing Germany.

Sauermann attended Martin-Andersen-Nexö-Gymnasium Dresden when she was in 12th grade. She won the Franz Ludwig Gehe Prize in 2011 and the gold medal in the age group III, the 11th–12th grade competition. As a result, she won a trip to the Royal Academy of Sciences in Stockholm. To achieve this, she presented a new mathematical theorem with a proof in a work entitled "Forests with Hypergraphs".

In 2011 she began studying mathematics at the University of Bonn. In 2014, she completed her bachelor thesis on algebraic geometry under Michael Rapoport. She became a graduate student studying with Jacob Fox at Stanford University where she obtained her PhD in 2019, receiving two prizes for her dissertation titled "Modern Methods in Extremal Combinatorics". After her graduation she worked as an assistant professor at Stanford before spending a year at the Institute for Advanced Study in Princeton. In 2021 became an assistant professor at MIT and received the European Prize in Combinatorics at Eurocomb for her work in combinatorics. In 2023 she accepted a tenured professorship at University of Bonn, where she currently works, her main field of work as of 2023 being probabilistic combinatorics. In 2022, she was awarded a Sloan fellowship, and in 2023, she received the von Kaven Award.

Her sister, Anne, two years her junior, was a successful participant in math and science Olympiads at the national level.

== Selected publications ==
- Sauermann, Lisa (2016). "On the μ-admissible set in the extended affine Weyl groups of E_{6} and E_{7}". Journal of Algebra. 451: 526–543. arXiv:1411.5427. doi:10.1016/j.jalgebra.2015.11.047. S2CID 118307812.
- Reiher, C.; ——— (2014). "Nash-Williams' theorem on decomposing graphs into forests". Mathematika. 60 (1): 32–36. arXiv:1705.01648. doi:10.1112/S0025579313000119. S2CID 119645044.
