= Alexey Pokrovskiy =

Mathematician specialising in combinatorics and graph theory

- Education: University of Cambridge; London School of Economics
- Awards: European Prize in Combinatorics (2019)
- Scientific career
- Fields: Mathematics
- Workplaces: University College London
- Doctoral advisors: Jan van den Heuvel; Jozef Skokan

Alexey Pokrovskiy is a mathematician specialising in combinatorics and graph theory. He is an associate professor in the Department of Mathematics at University College London. He is known for his work in extremal and probabilistic combinatorics, including a proof of Ringel’s conjecture with Richard Montgomery and Benny Sudakov for large graphs, as covered by Quanta magazine. In 2019, he and Montgomery received the European Prize in Combinatorics.

== Education and career ==
Pokrovskiy studied mathematics at the University of Cambridge, receiving a BA in 2008 and an MMath with distinction in 2009. He completed a PhD in mathematics at the London School of Economics in 2013 under the supervision of Jan van den Heuvel and Jozef Skokan.

Pokrovskiy was a postdoctoral researcher at the Free University of Berlin from 2013 to 2015 and at ETH Zurich from 2015 to 2018. He was then a lecturer at Birkbeck, University of London from 2018 to 2020, before joining University College London in 2020.

== Research ==
Pokrovskiy's work is in discrete mathematics, especially extremal and probabilistic combinatorics. His notable results include an approximate version of the Aharoni-Berger conjecture and his work with Matija Bucić, Matthew Kwan and Benny Sudakov on Rota's basis conjecture. His other significant works include a proof with Richard Montgomery and Benny Sudakov of Ringel's conjecture for large graphs and his work with Alp Müyesser giving a random version of the Hall–Paige conjecture.

== Awards and honours ==
In 2019, Pokrovskiy shared the European Prize in Combinatorics with Richard Montgomery. The prize announcement cited their "deep contributions to extremal and probabilistic combinatorics".

== Selected publications ==
- Pokrovskiy, Alexey (2015). "A linear bound on the Manickam–Miklós–Singhi conjecture". Journal of Combinatorial Theory. Series A. 133: 280–306. arXiv:1308.2176. doi:10.1016/j.jcta.2015.01.007.
- Pokrovskiy, Alexey (2018). "An approximate version of a conjecture of Aharoni and Berger". Advances in Mathematics. 333: 1197–1241. arXiv:1609.06346. doi:10.1016/j.aim.2018.05.036.
- Bucić, Matija; Kwan, Matthew; Pokrovskiy, Alexey; Sudakov, Benny (2020). "Halfway to Rota's Basis Conjecture". International Mathematics Research Notices. 2020 (21): 8007–8026. arXiv:1810.07462. doi:10.1093/imrn/rnaa004.
- Montgomery, Richard; Pokrovskiy, Alexey; Sudakov, Benny (2021). "A proof of Ringel's conjecture". Geometric and Functional Analysis. 31 (3): 663–720. arXiv:2001.02665. doi:10.1007/s00039-021-00576-2.
- Müyesser, Alp; Pokrovskiy, Alexey (2025). "A random Hall-Paige conjecture". Inventiones Mathematicae. 240 (3): 779–867. arXiv:2204.09666. Bibcode:2025InMat.240..779M. doi:10.1007/s00222-025-01328-x.
