= Balázs Szegedy =

Hungarian mathematician

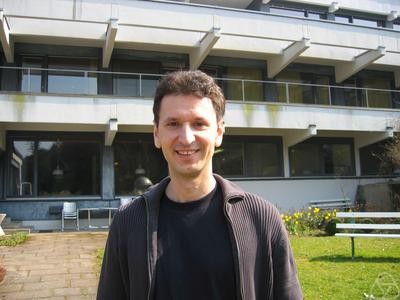
Szegedy at Oberwolfach in 2007

Balázs Szegedy is a Hungarian mathematician whose research concerns combinatorics and graph theory.

Szegedy earned a master's degree in 1998 and a PhD in 2003 from Eötvös Loránd University in Budapest. His dissertation, supervised by Péter Pál Pálfy, was about group theory and was entitled "On the Sylow and Borel subgroups of classical groups". After temporary positions at the Alfréd Rényi Institute of Mathematics, Microsoft Research, and the Institute for Advanced Study, he joined the faculty of the University of Toronto Scarborough in 2006. He returned to the Rényi Institute in 2013.

Szegedy won the Géza Grünwald Commemorative Prize for young researchers of the János Bolyai Mathematical Society in 2002. He was one of two winners of the 2009 European Prize in Combinatorics, and in 2010 he became a Sloan Fellow. With László Lovász, he was one of the winners of the 2012 Fulkerson Prize, for their joint work on graph limits. He was the 2013 winner of the Coxeter–James Prize of the Canadian Mathematical Society.

In 2018, Szegedy was an invited speaker at the International Congress of Mathematicians in Rio de Janeiro.
