= LOHS =

Lohs or LOHS may refer to:

- Wolf pack Lohs, a flotilla of German submarines in the Second World War
- Lake Odessa Area Historical Society, Lake Odessa, Michigan, United States

== People ==
- Gabriele Lohs (born 1957), German rower
- Johannes Lohs (1889–1918), German U-boat commander during the First World War

== Schools ==
- Lake Orion High School, Lake Orion, Michigan, United States
- Lake Oswego High School, Lake Oswego, Oregon, United States
- Live Oak High School (Louisiana), Watson, Louisiana, United States
- Live Oak High School (Morgan Hill, California), United States
- Lone Oak High School (Kentucky), Lone Oak, Kentucky, United States
- Los Osos High School, Rancho Cucamonga, California, United States

== See also ==
- Loh (disambiguation)
