= Julian Sahasrabudhe =

Canadian mathematician

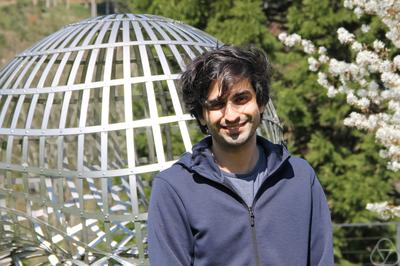
- Sahasrabudhe at Oberwolfach in 2019
- Born: May 8, 1988 (age 38)
- Education: Simon Fraser University (BA); University of Memphis (PhD)
- Scientific career
- Fields: Mathematics
- Workplaces: University of Cambridge
- Thesis: Extremal and Ramsey Problems on Graphs and the Integers (2017)
- Doctoral advisor: Béla Bollobás

Julian Sahasrabudhe (born May 8, 1988) is a Canadian mathematician who is an assistant professor of mathematics at the University of Cambridge, in their Department of Pure Mathematics and Mathematical Statistics. His research interests are in extremal and probabilistic combinatorics, Ramsey theory, random polynomials and matrices, and combinatorial number theory.

== Life and education ==
Sahasrabudhe grew up on Bowen Island, British Columbia, Canada. He studied music at Capilano College and later moved to study at Simon Fraser University where he completed his undergraduate degree in mathematics. After graduating in 2012, Julian received his Ph.D. in 2017 under the supervision of Béla Bollobás at the University of Memphis.

Following his Ph.D., Sahasrabudhe was a Junior Research Fellow at Peterhouse, Cambridge from 2017 to 2021. He currently holds a position as an assistant professor in the Department of Pure Mathematics and Mathematical Statistics (DPMMS) at the University of Cambridge.

== Career and research ==
Sahasrabudhe's work covers many topics such as Littlewood problems on polynomials, probability and geometry of polynomials, arithmetic Ramsey theory, Erdős covering systems, random matrices and polynomials, etc. In one of his more recent works in Ramsey theory, he published a paper on Exponential Patterns in Arithmetic Ramsey Theory in 2018 by building on an observation made by Alessandro Sisto in 2011. He proved that for every finite colouring of the natural numbers there exists $a, b > 1$ such that the triple $a,b,a^b$ is monochromatic, demonstrating the partition regularity of complex exponential patterns. This work marks a crucial development in understanding the structure of numbers under partitioning.

In 2023, Sahasrabudhe submitted a paper titled An exponential improvement for diagonal Ramsey along with Marcelo Campos, Simon Griffiths, and Robert Morris. In this paper, they proved that the Ramsey number

$R(k) \leq (4-\epsilon)^k$ for some constant $\epsilon > 0$

This is the first exponential improvement over the upper bound of Erdős and Szekeres, proved in 1935.

Sahasrabudhe has also worked with Marcelo Campos, Matthew Jenssen, and Marcus Michelen on random matrix theory with the paper The singularity probability of a random symmetric matrix is exponentially small. The paper addresses a long-standing conjecture concerning symmetric matrix with entries in $\{-1, 1\}$. They proved that the probability of such a matrix being singular is exponentially small. The research quantifies this probability as $\mathbb{P}(\det(A)=0)\leq e^{-cn}$ where $A$ is drawn uniformly at random from the set of all $n \times n$ symmetric matrices and $c$ is an absolute constant.

In 2020, Sahasrabudhe published a paper named Flat Littlewood Polynomial exists, which he co-authored with Paul Ballister, Bela Bollobás, Robert Morris, and Marius Tiba. This work confirms the Littlewood conjecture by demonstrating the existence of Littlewood polynomials with coefficients of $\pm 1$ that are flat, meaning their magnitudes remain bounded within a specific range on the complex unit circle. This achievement not only validates a hypothesis made by Littlewood in 1966 but also contributes significantly to the field of mathematics, particularly in combinatorics and polynomial analysis.

In 2022, the authors worked on Erdős covering systems with the paper On the Erdős Covering Problem: The Density of the Uncovered Set. They confirmed and provided a stronger proof of a conjecture proposed by Micheal Filaseta, Kevin Ford, Sergei Konyagin, Carl Pomerance, and Gang Yu, which states that for distinct moduli within the interval $[n, Cn]$, the density of uncovered integers is bounded below by a constant. Furthermore, the authors establish a condition on the moduli that provides an optimal lower bound for the density of the uncovered set.

== Awards and honours ==
In August 2021, Julian Sahasrabudhe was awarded the European Prize in Combinatorics for his contribution to applying combinatorial methods to problems in harmonic analysis, combinatorial number theory, Ramsey theory, and probability theory. In particular, Sahasrabudhe proved theorems on the Littlewood problems, on geometry of polynomials (Pemantle's conjecture), and on problems of Erdős, Schinzel, and Selfridge.

In October 2023, Julian Sahasrabudhe was awarded with the Salem Prize for his contribution to harmonic analysis, probability theory, and combinatorics. More specifically, Sahasrabudhe improved the bound on the singularity probability of random symmetric matrices and obtained a new upper bound for diagonal Ramsey numbers.

Sahasrabudhe is a 2024 recipient of the Whitehead Prize, given "for his outstanding contributions to Ramsey theory, his solutions to famous problems in complex analysis and random matrix theory, and his remarkable progress on sphere packings".

== Personal life ==
Sahasrabudhe's parents are television producers Deepak Sahasrabudhe and Susan Miller. His grandfather, Madhu Sahasrabudhe, was the acting director of the Food Research Institute of Agriculture and Agri-Food Canada.

== Publications ==
=== Dissertation ===
- Sahasrabudhe, Julian David Raja (2017). "Extremal and Ramsey Problems on Graphs and the Integers". University of Memphis Digital Commons.

=== Selected research articles ===
- Exponential Patterns in Arithmetic Ramsey Theory (2018)
- Sahasrabudhe, Julian (2019). "Counting zeros of cosine polynomials: on a problem of Littlewood". Advances in Mathematics. 343: 495–521. arXiv:1610.07680. doi:10.1016/j.aim.2018.11.025.
- Sahasrabudhe, Julian; Marcus, Micheal (2019). "Central limit theorems from the roots of probability generating functions". Advances in Mathematics. 358 106840. arXiv:1804.07696. doi:10.1016/j.aim.2019.106840.
- Flat Littlewood polynomials exist (2020)
- The singularity probability of a random symmetric matrix is exponentially small (2021)
- Campos, Marcelo; Jenssen, Matthew Jenssen; Michelen, Marcus; Sahasrabudhe, Julian (2022). "The least singular value of a random symmetric matrix". Forum of Math: Pi. arXiv:2203.06141.
- On the Erdős Covering Problem: the density of the uncovered set (2022)
- Campos, Marcelo; Griffiths, Simon; Morris, Robert; Sahasrabudhe, Julian (1 May 2026). "An exponential improvement for diagonal Ramsey". Annals of Mathematics. 203 (3): 869–932. arXiv:2303.09521. doi:10.4007/annals.2026.203.3.4. ISSN 0003-486X.
