= Péter Frankl =

Hungarian street performer in Japan

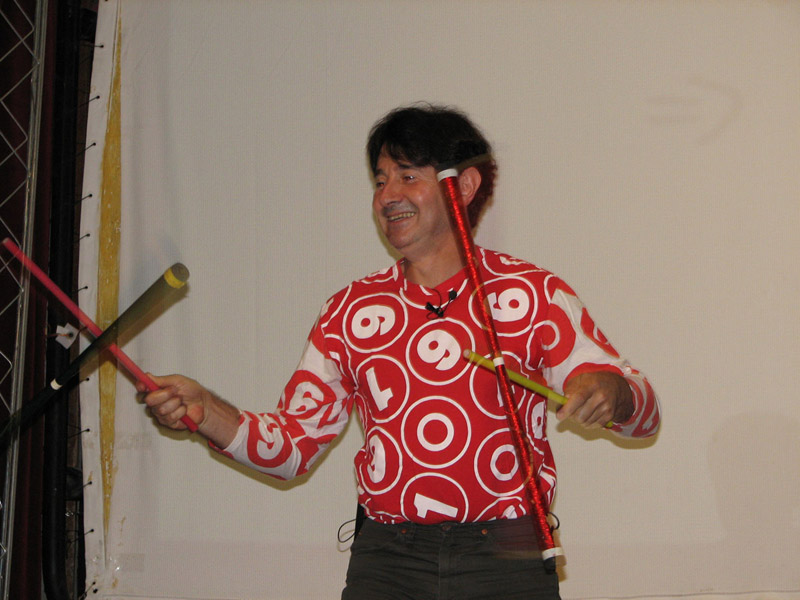
- Peter Frankl at a mathematics conference in Tehran in May 2009
- Born: 26 March 1953 (age 73); Kaposvár, Somogy County, Hungary
- Awards: Silver and gold medal at IMO, The Minister of Foreign Affairs Prize of the Japan Prize, silver award from US international film festival
- Scientific career
- Fields: Combinatorics
- Doctoral advisor: Gyula O.H. Katona

Péter Frankl (born 26 March 1953) is a mathematician, street performer, columnist and educator, active in Japan. Frankl studied mathematics at Eötvös Loránd University in Budapest and submitted his PhD thesis while still an undergraduate. He holds a PhD degree from the University Paris Diderot as well. He has lived in Japan since 1988, where he is a well-known personality and often appears in the media. He keeps travelling around Japan performing (juggling and giving public lectures on various topics). Frankl won a gold medal at the International Mathematical Olympiad in 1971. He has seven joint papers with Paul Erdős, and eleven joint papers with Ronald Graham. His research is in combinatorics, especially in extremal combinatorics. He is the author of the union-closed sets conjecture.

== Personality ==
Both of his parents were survivors of concentration camps and taught him "The only things you own are in your heart and brain". So he became a mathematician. Frankl often lectures about racial discrimination.

== Adolescence and abilities ==
He could multiply two digit numbers when he was four years old. Frankl speaks 12 languages (Hungarian, English, Russian, Swedish, French, Spanish, Polish, German, Japanese, Chinese, Thai, Korean) and lectured mathematics in many countries in these languages. He has travelled to more than 100 countries.

== Activities ==
Frankl learnt juggling from Ronald Graham. He and Vojtěch Rödl solved a $1000 problem of Paul Erdős. Zsolt Baranyai helped Frankl to get a scholarship in France, where he became a CNRS research fellow.

For 1984 to 1990, Frankl and Akiyama worked hard organizing a Japanese mathematical Olympiad team, and as a consequence the Japanese team is now a regular participant of the International Mathematical Olympiad.

Since 1998, he is an external member of the Hungarian Academy of Sciences.

He authored more than thirty books in Japanese, and with László Babai, he wrote the manuscript of a book on "Linear Algebra Methods in Combinatorics". With Norihide Tokushige he is the coauthor of the book Extremal Problems For Finite Sets (American Mathematical Society, 2018).

== Frankl conjecture ==
For any finite union-closed family of finite sets, other than the family consisting only of the empty set, there exists an element that belongs to at least half of the sets in the family.

== See also ==
- Frankl–Rödl graph
