= János Komlós (mathematician) =

Hungarian-American mathematician

János Komlós (born 23 May 1942, in Budapest) is a Hungarian-American mathematician, working in probability theory and discrete mathematics. He has been a professor of mathematics at Rutgers University since 1988. He graduated from the Eötvös Loránd University, then became a fellow at the Mathematical Institute of the Hungarian Academy of Sciences. Between 1984–1988 he worked at the University of California, San Diego.

== Notable results ==
- Komlós' theorem: He proved that every L^{1}-bounded sequence of real functions contains a subsequence such that the arithmetic means of all its subsequences converge pointwise almost everywhere. In probabilistic terminology, the theorem is as follows. Let ξ_{1},ξ_{2},... be a sequence of random variables such that E[ξ_{1}],E[ξ_{2}],... is bounded. Then there exist a subsequence ξ'_{1}, ξ'_{2},... and a random variable β such that for each further subsequence η_{1},η_{2},... of ξ'_{0}, ξ'_{1},... we have (η_{1}+...+η_{n})/n → β a.s.
- With Miklós Ajtai and Endre Szemerédi he proved the ct^{2}/log t upper bound for the Ramsey number R(3,t). The corresponding lower bound was established by Jeong Han Kim only in 1995, and this result earned him a Fulkerson Prize.
- The same team of authors developed the optimal Ajtai–Komlós–Szemerédi sorting network.
- Komlós conjectured that there exists a universal constant $K$ independent of $d, n$, such that given any set $v_1 , \dots , v_n$ of unit-vectors in $\R^d$, we can partition them to two sets $K_+, K_-$, such that the distance between $\sum_{v\in K_+} v, \sum_{v\in K_-} v$ is at most $K$.
- Komlós and Szemerédi proved that if G is a random graph on n vertices with
$\frac12n\log n+\frac12n\log\log n+cn$

edges, where c is a fixed real number, then the probability that G has a Hamiltonian circuit converges to

$e^{-e^{-2c}}.$
- With Gábor Sárközy and Endre Szemerédi he proved the so-called blow-up lemma which claims that the regular pairs in Szemerédi's regularity lemma are similar to complete bipartite graphs when considering the embedding of graphs with bounded degrees.
- Komlós worked on Heilbronn's problem; he, János Pintz and Szemerédi disproved Heilbronn's conjecture.
- Komlós also wrote highly cited papers on sums of random variables, space-efficient representations of sparse sets, random matrices, the Szemerédi regularity lemma, and derandomization.
- Together with Miklós Ajtai and Gábor Tusnády he proved in 1984 the AKT optimal matching theorem.

== Degrees, awards ==
Komlós received his Ph.D. in 1967 from Eötvös Loránd University under the supervision of Alfréd Rényi. In 1975, he received the Alfréd Rényi Prize, a prize established for researchers of the Alfréd Rényi Institute of Mathematics. In 1998, he was elected as an external member to the Hungarian Academy of Sciences.

== See also ==
- Komlós–Major–Tusnády approximation
