= Miklós Ajtai =

Hungarian-American computer scientist

Miklos Ajtai
- Born: 2 July 1946 (age 80); Budapest, Second Republic of Hungary
- Education: Hungarian Academy of Sciences
- Awards: Knuth Prize (2003); John von Neumann Medal (2025)
- Scientific career
- Fields: Computational complexity theory
- Institutions: IBM Almaden Research Center

Miklós Ajtai (born 2 July 1946) is a computer scientist at the IBM Almaden Research Center, United States. In 2003, he received the Knuth Prize for his numerous contributions to the field, including a classic sorting network algorithm (developed jointly with J. Komlós and Endre Szemerédi), exponential lower bounds, superlinear time–space tradeoffs for branching programs, and other "unique and spectacular" results. He is a member of the U.S. National Academy of Sciences.

== Selected results ==
One of Ajtai's results states that the length of proofs in propositional logic of the pigeonhole principle for n items grows faster than any polynomial in n. He also proved that the statement "any two countable structures that are second-order equivalent are also isomorphic" is both consistent with and independent of ZFC. Ajtai and Szemerédi proved the corners theorem, an important step toward higher-dimensional generalizations of the Szemerédi theorem. With Komlós and Szemerédi, he proved the ct^{2}/log t upper bound for the Ramsey number R(3,t). With Komlós and Tusnády he proved in 1984 the AKT optimal matching theorem. The corresponding lower bound was proved by Kim only in 1995, a result that earned him a Fulkerson Prize. With Chvátal, Newborn, and Szemerédi, Ajtai proved the crossing number inequality, that any drawing of a graph with n vertices and m edges, where m > 4n, has at least m^{3} / 100n^{2} crossings. Ajtai and Dwork devised in 1997 a lattice-based public-key cryptosystem; Ajtai has done extensive work on lattice problems. For his numerous contributions in Theoretical Computer Science, he received the Knuth Prize. IEEE awarded Ajtai the John von Neumann Medal in 2025 for "contributions to establishing lower bounds in computational complexity and founding lattice-based cryptography."

== Biography ==
Ajtai received his Candidate of Sciences degree in 1976 from the Hungarian Academy of Sciences. Since 1995, he has been an external member of the Hungarian Academy of Sciences.

In 1998, he was an Invited Speaker of the International Congress of Mathematicians in Berlin. In 2012, he was elected as a Fellow of the American Association for the Advancement of Science. In 2021, he was elected a member of the National Academy of Sciences.

== Bibliography ==
- Ajtai, Miklós (10 May 2008). "Optimal lower bounds for the Korkine-Zolotareff parameters of a lattice and for Schnorr's algorithm for the shortest vector problem". Theory of Computing. 4: 21–51. doi:10.4086/toc.2008.v004a002.
- Ajtai, Miklós (5 October 2005). "A Non-linear Time Lower Bound for Boolean Branching Programs". Theory of Computing. 1: 149–176. doi:10.4086/toc.2005.v001a008.
- Ajtai, M. (1996). "Generating hard instances of lattice problems (Extended abstract)". Proceedings of the twenty-eighth annual ACM symposium on Theory of computing - STOC '96. pp. 99–108. doi:10.1145/237814.237838. ISBN 978-0-89791-785-8. S2CID 6864824.

== Selected papers ==
1. Ajtai, M. (September 1979). "Isomorphism and higher order equivalence". Annals of Mathematical Logic. 16 (3): 181–203. doi:10.1016/0003-4843(79)90001-9.
2. Ajtai, M.; Komlós, J.; Szemerédi, E. (March 1982). "Largest random component of a k-cube". Combinatorica. 2 (1): 1–7. doi:10.1007/BF02579276. S2CID 7903662.
