= Martin-Andersen-Nexö-Gymnasium Dresden =

School in Dresden, Germany

Coordinates: 51°2′47″N 13°46′48″E

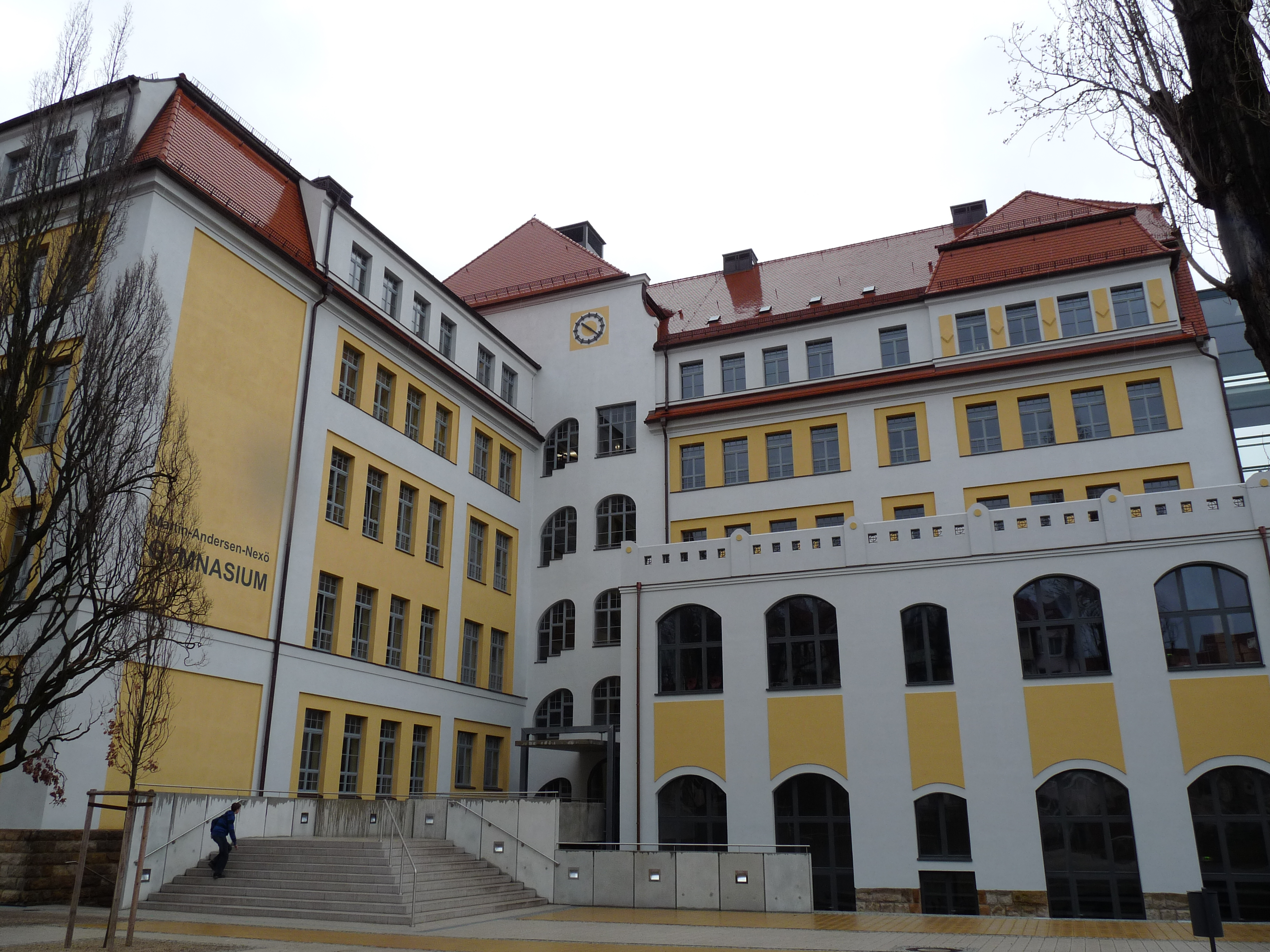

Information
- Established: 1903; 123 years ago
- Language: German
- Website: manos-dresden.de

The Martin-Andersen-Nexö-Gymnasium Dresden (MANOS) is a selective high school (gymnasium) in Dresden, Germany, with a special focus on mathematics and sciences. It was formerly the school for radio mechanics in the GDR. It is named after the Danish writer Martin Andersen Nexø.

The current head of school is Mr. Holm Wieczoreck.

== History ==
- 1903 Creation of classes for secondary education at the Bürgerschule Blasewitz
- 1904 Planning for own school building
- 1907 Start of the construction
- 1908 Inauguration of the new school building as Realgymnasium Blasewitz on April 30, 1908
- 1938 Renaming to Schillerschule Blasewitz
- 1945 Anglo-American air raid on Dresden on February 13, 1945, damages the roof of the school building
- 1945 Resumption of classes on October 1, 1945, as the Oberschule Dresden-Ost, housed in various buildings, with separate classes for boys and girls
- 1947 First mixed classes on September 1, 1947
- 1949 Complete co-education
- 1954 Renaming to Martin-Andersen-Nexö-Oberschule
- 1963 School for radio mechanics
- 1964 School for electronics industry
- 1969 Inauguration of the Martin Andersen Nexö Memorial on June 26, 1969
- 1986 Selective school for mathematics and sciences
- 1992 Foundation of Gymnasium Dresden-Blasewitz in Seidnitz (in the former 94th Polytechnic Secondary School) with a branch campus for advanced mathematics and science courses in the Kretschmerstraße
- 1998 The building in the Kretschmerstraße becomes the main campus of the Gymnasium Dresden-Blasewitz
- 2001 The school officially regains the name Martin-Andersen-Nexö-Gymnasium Dresden
- 2008 The school moves to the facilities of the former Joseph-Haydn-Gymnasium in Dresden-Striesen.

== Profile ==
The school focuses early on a more advanced education in mathematics and sciences. An entrance examination is required for admission to the school. With more classes than normal in mathematics, biology, physics, chemistry and informatics, the students from grade 7 on learn more about STEM than students in a regular high school.

The school also has a contract with the Dresden University of Technology under which students in grades 7 and 8 spend a week there doing a project. In addition, 11th-grade students in the intensive program are required to carry out a scientific study. Students also take three subjects, rather than the normal two, at a higher level.

Students regularly take part in competitions like the International Mathematical Olympiad, the International Physics Olympiad, the International Olympiad in Informatics, and the International Chemistry Olympiad.

The school's alumni includes the research mathematician Lisa Sauermann, who received acclaim for her results at the International Mathematical Olympiad.
