= Po-Shen Loh =

American mathematician

- 罗博深
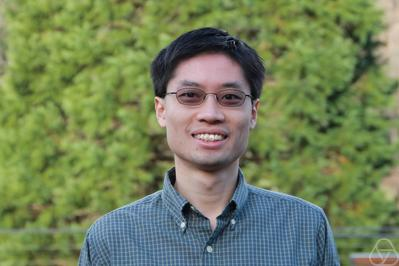
- Born: June 18, 1982 (age 44); California, U.S.
- Education: California Institute of Technology (BS); University of Cambridge (MASt); Princeton University (PhD)
- Children: 3
- Scientific career
- Fields: Discrete mathematics
- Workplaces: Carnegie Mellon University
- Thesis: Results in Extremal and Probabilistic Combinatorics (2010)
- Doctoral advisor: Benny Sudakov

Po-Shen Loh (Chinese: 罗博深; pinyin: Luó Bóshēn; born June 18, 1982) is an American mathematician specializing in combinatorics. Loh teaches at Carnegie Mellon University, and from 2014 to 2023 served as the national coach of the United States' International Mathematical Olympiad team. He is the founder of educational websites Expii and Live, and lead developer of contact-tracing app NOVID.

== Early life and education ==
Loh was born on June 18, 1982, in California and raised in Madison, Wisconsin, to Singaporean Chinese immigrants Wei-Yin and Theresa Loh. As a middle school student, Loh twice represented Wisconsin in the national Mathcounts competition. He attended James Madison Memorial High School, and in 1999 won a silver medal representing the US in the International Mathematical Olympiad (IMO).

Loh studied mathematics as an undergraduate student at the California Institute of Technology. In 2003, he won a Goldwater Scholarship. In 2004, he graduated with honors, ranked first in his graduating class, and his undergraduate thesis received an honorable mention for the 2004 Morgan Prize. Loh completed a one-year master's degree at Cambridge University on a Churchill Scholarship.

Loh pursued graduate studies in mathematics at Princeton University with the support of a Hertz Fellowship, and, under the supervision of Benny Sudakov, received a Ph.D. in 2010 with his dissertation Results in extremal and probabilistic combinatorics.

== Career ==
=== Teaching and coaching ===
Loh's math coaching career started in 2002 when he first served as an assistant coach at the US national IMO training camp, Mathematical Olympiad Summer Program. In 2010, Loh was appointed deputy leader Team USA for the IMO, and in 2014 he was appointed leader and was the national coach for 9 years, until 2023. Under his coaching, the team won the competition in 2015, 2016, 2018, and 2019—their first victories since 1994.

Loh has been a professor at Carnegie Mellon University since 2010, where he teaches courses on discrete mathematics and extremal combinatorics. Loh runs the training seminar for the Putnam competition for Carnegie Mellon undergraduates.

=== Research ===
Loh works at the intersections of combinatorics, graph theory, probability, and computer science, and as of 2025 he has written 41 publications.

In 2019, Loh developed an alternative method and exposition for the solution of quadratic equations, based on the symmetry of parabolas.

=== Other projects ===
Loh is a creator of expository math videos on YouTube under the channel name Daily Challenge with Po-Shen Loh. He has also made many appearances on other math-related channels, which have collectively been viewed millions of times. Loh's videos have been praised for their attractive diagrams and high quality.

Loh is the founder of Expii, a crowdsourced math lesson and problem solving website with tens of thousands of users. Loh also founded Live, a math education site in which student teachers teach small courses surrounding middle and high school competition math concepts via livestreaming and video chat, as a way to improve interactivity of remote learning during the COVID-19 pandemic.

In March 2020, Loh and other Hertz fellows were asked to assist in helping combat the COVID-19 pandemic. They developed NOVID, a contact tracing app with the unique feature of notifying users before exposure, whenever someone in their social network is affected, rather than after. NOVID tracks infections anonymously using location information gathered from inter-communicating cell phones, and was tested in pilot studies on college campuses.

== Family ==
Loh is the son of Wei-Yin Loh, a Singaporean statistician at the University of Wisconsin. His sister Po-Ling Loh is a professor of statistics at the University of Cambridge, and his brother Po-Ru Loh is an associate professor of medicine at Harvard University. His uncle, Wei-Liem Loh, is a statistician at the National University of Singapore.
