= Eurocomb =

Academic conference

Eurocomb, the European Conference on Combinatorics, Graph Theory and Applications, is an academic conference in the mathematical field of combinatorics.

Eurocomb has been held biennially since 2001. Since 2003, the European Prize in Combinatorics has been awarded at the conference.

For each instance of the conference, the program committee selects from submitted extended abstracts those that are to be presented as talks or poster presentations. Topics include algebraic combinatorics, combinatorial geometry, combinatorial number theory, combinatorial optimization, designs and configurations, enumerative combinatorics, extremal combinatorics, graph theory, ordered sets, random methods, and topological combinatorics.

== See also ==
- European Prize in Combinatorics
