= Wojciech Samotij =

Polish mathematician (born 1983)

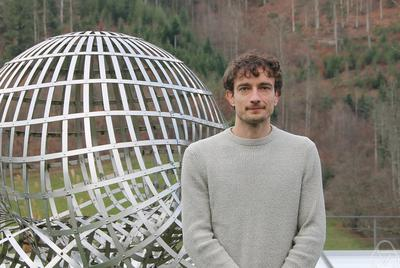
- Samotij at Oberwolfach in 2023
- Born: 1983 (age 42–43); Wrocław, Poland
- Education: University of Wrocław; University of Illinois at Urbana-Champaign
- Known for: combinatorics, additive number theory, Ramsey theory, graph theory
- Awards: Leroy P. Steele Prize (2024); Erdős Prize (2022); George Pólya Prize (2016); Dénes Kőnig Prize (2014); European Prize in Combinatorics (2013); Kuratowski Prize (2013)
- Scientific career
- Fields: Mathematics
- Workplaces: Tel Aviv University
- Thesis: Extremal Problems In Pseudo-random Graphs And Asymptotic Enumeration (2010)
- Doctoral advisor: Jozsef Balogh
- Website: www.math.tau.ac.il/~samotij/

Wojciech Samotij (Polish: [ˈvɔjt͡ɕɛx saˈmɔtij]; born 1983 in Wrocław) is a Polish mathematician and a full professor at the School of Mathematical Sciences at the Tel Aviv University. He is known for his work in combinatorics, additive number theory, Ramsey theory and graph theory.

== Education and career ==
He studied at the University of Wrocław where in 2007 he obtained his Master of Science degrees in mathematics and computer science. He received his PhD in 2011 at University of Illinois at Urbana-Champaign on the basis of his dissertation titled Extremal Problems In Pseudo-random Graphs And Asymptotic Enumeration and written under the supervision of József Balogh.

Between 2010 and 2014, he was a fellow of the Trinity College, Cambridge at the University of Cambridge. Currently, he is an associate professor at Tel Aviv University. He published his scientific work in such journals as Random Structures & Algorithms, Journal of the American Mathematical Society, or Israel Journal of Mathematics.

== Awards and recognition ==
He received the 2013 Kuratowski Prize conferred jointly by the Polish Academy of Sciences and the Polish Mathematical Society to young mathematicians under the age of 30. The same year, he won the 2013 European Prize in Combinatorics. Samotij is also the recipient of the 2016 George Pólya Prize and the 2022 Erdős Prize. In 2024 he was awarded the Leroy P. Steele Prize for Seminal Contribution to Research jointly with József Balogh and Robert Morris.

In 2026, Samotij participated at the International Congress of Mathematicians in Philadelphia, where he delivered a lecture entitled "Entropy Methods in Combinatorics".

== Selected publications ==
- with József Balogh, Robert Morris, and Lutz Warnke: Balogh, József; Morris, Robert; Samotij, Wojciech; Warnke, Lutz (2016), "The typical structure of sparse $K_{r+1}$-free graphs", Transactions of the American Mathematical Society, 368: 6439–6485, arXiv:1307.5967, doi:10.1090/tran/6552, S2CID 17878868
- with József Balogh and Robert Morris: Balogh, József; Morris, Robert; Samotij, Wojciech (2015), "Independent sets in hypergraphs", Journal of the American Mathematical Society, 28 (3): 669–709, arXiv:1204.6530, doi:10.1090/S0894-0347-2014-00816-X
- with Noga Alon, József Balogh, and Robert Morris: Alon, Noga; Balogh, József; Morris, Robert; Samotij, Wojciech (January 2014), "A refinement of the Cameron-Erdős conjecture", Proceedings of the London Mathematical Society, 108 (1): 44–72, arXiv:1202.5200, doi:10.1112/plms/pdt033, S2CID 1536592
- with Noga Alon, József Balogh, and Robert Morris: Alon, Noga; Balogh, József; Morris, Robert; Samotij, Wojciech (January 2014), "Counting sum-free sets in Abelian groups", Israel Journal of Mathematics, 199: 309–344, arXiv:1201.6654, doi:10.1007/s11856-013-0067-y
- with Ron Peled: Peled, Ron; Samotij, Wojciech (August 2014), "Odd cutsets and the hard-core model on $\mathbb{Z}^d$", Annales de l'Institut Henri Poincaré, Probabilités et Statistiques, 50 (3): 975–998, arXiv:1106.3594, doi:10.1214/12-AIHP535
- with József Balogh: Balogh, József; Samotij, Wojciech (April 2011), "The number of $K_{s,t}$-free graphs", Journal of the London Mathematical Society, 83 (2): 368–388, doi:10.1112/jlms/jdq086, S2CID 7455668

== See also ==
- List of Polish mathematicians
- Combinatorics
- Ramsey theory
