= European Prize in Combinatorics =

Mathematics award

The European Prize in Combinatorics is a prize for research in combinatorics, a mathematical discipline, which is awarded biennially at Eurocomb, the European conference on combinatorics, graph theory, and applications. The prize was first awarded at Eurocomb 2003 in Prague. Recipients must not be older than 35. The most recent prize was awarded at Eurocomb 2025 in Budapest.

- 2003 Daniela Kühn, Deryk Osthus, Alain Plagne
- 2005 Dmitry Feichtner-Kozlov
- 2007 Gilles Schaeffer
- 2009 Peter Keevash, Balázs Szegedy
- 2011 David Conlon, Daniel Kráľ
- 2013 Wojciech Samotij, Tom Sanders
- 2015 Karim Adiprasito, Zdeněk Dvořák, Rob Morris
- 2017 Christian Reiher, Maryna Viazovska
- 2019 Richard Montgomery, Alexey Pokrovskiy
- 2021 Péter Pál Pach, Julian Sahasrabudhe, Lisa Sauermann, István Tomon
- 2023 Johannes Carmesin, Felix Joos
- 2025 Matija Bucic, Oliver Janzer, Cosmin Pohoata, Dmitrii Zakharov

== See also ==
- List of mathematics awards
