= Komlós' theorem =

Theorem

Komlós' theorem is a theorem from probability theory and mathematical analysis about the Cesàro convergence of a subsequence of random variables (or functions) and their subsequences to an integrable random variable (or function). It's also an existence theorem for an integrable random variable (or function). There exist a probabilistic and an analytical version for finite measure spaces.

The theorem was proven in 1967 by János Komlós. There exists also a generalization from 1970 by Srishti D. Chatterji.

== Komlós' theorem ==
=== Probabilistic version ===
Let $(\Omega,\mathcal{F},P)$ be a probability space and $\xi_1,\xi_2,\dots$ be a sequence of real-valued random variables defined on this space with $\sup\limits_{n}\mathbb{E}[|\xi_n|]<\infty.$

Then there exists a random variable $\psi\in L^1(P)$ and a subsequence $(\eta_k)=(\xi_{n_{k}})$, such that for every arbitrary subsequence $(\tilde{\eta}_n)=(\eta_{k_{n}})$ when $n\to \infty$ then

$$\frac{(\tilde{\eta}_1+\cdots +\tilde{\eta}_n)}{n}\to \psi$$

$P$-almost surely.

=== Analytic version ===
Let $(E,\mathcal{A},\mu)$ be a finite measure space and $f_1,f_2,\dots$ be a sequence of real-valued functions in $L^1(\mu)$ and $\sup\limits_n \int_E |f_n|\mathrm{d}\mu<\infty$. Then there exists a function $\upsilon \in L^1(\mu)$ and a subsequence $(g_k)=(f_{n_{k}})$ such that for every arbitrary subsequence $(\tilde{g}_n)=(g_{k_{n}})$ if $n\to \infty$ then

$$\frac{(\tilde{g}_1+\cdots +\tilde{g}_n)}{n}\to \upsilon$$

$\mu$-almost everywhere.

=== Explanations ===
So the theorem says, that the sequence $(\eta_k)$ and all its subsequences converge in Césaro.

== Literature ==
- Kabanov, Yuri & Pergamenshchikov, Sergei. (2003). Two-scale stochastic systems. Asymptotic analysis and control. 10.1007/978-3-662-13242-5. Page 250.
