= Géza Grünwald =

Hungarian mathematician

Géza Grünwald (October 18, 1910, Budapest – September 7, 1943) was a Hungarian mathematician of Jewish heritage who worked on analysis. He died in the Holocaust.

== See also ==
- Grunwald–Wang theorem
