= David Conlon =

Irish mathematician (born 1982)

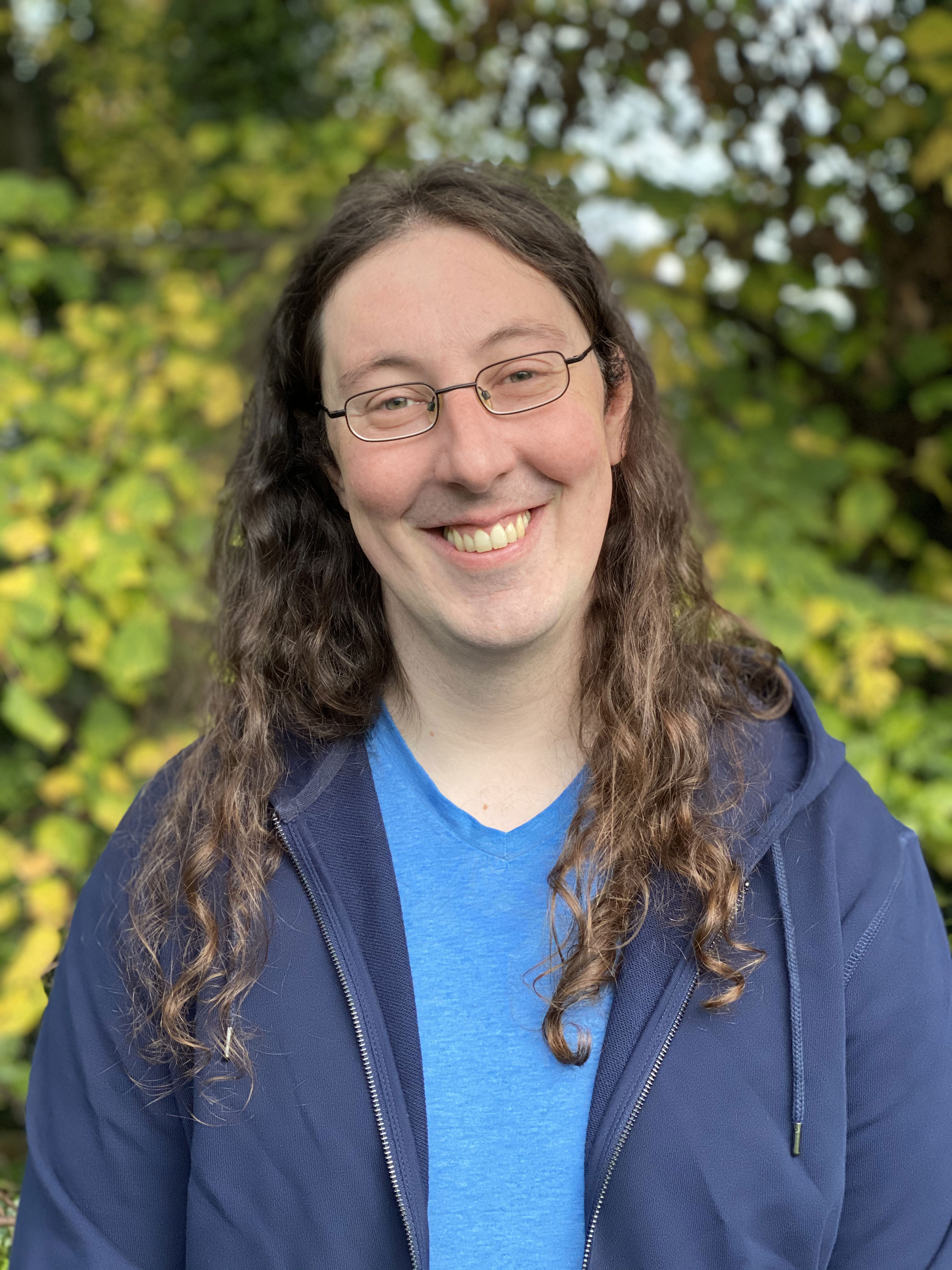
- Conlon in 2020
- Born: 1982 (age 43–44); Ireland
- Education: University of Cambridge (PhD, 2009); Trinity College Dublin (2003)
- Awards: Whitehead Prize (2019); European Prize in Combinatorics (2011)
- Scientific career
- Fields: Mathematics
- Institutions: University of Oxford; California Institute of Technology
- Thesis: Upper Bounds for Ramsey Numbers (2009)
- Doctoral advisor: Timothy Gowers

David Conlon (born 1982) is an Irish mathematician who is a Professor of Mathematics at the California Institute of Technology. His research interests are in Hungarian-style combinatorics, particularly Ramsey theory, extremal graph theory, combinatorial number theory, and probabilistic methods in combinatorics. He proved the first superpolynomial improvement on the Erdős–Szekeres bound on diagonal Ramsey numbers. He won the European Prize in Combinatorics in 2011 for his work in Ramsey theory and for his progress on Sidorenko's conjecture, and the Whitehead Prize in 2019.

== Life ==
Conlon represented Ireland in the International Mathematical Olympiad in 1998 and 1999. He was an undergraduate in Trinity College Dublin, where he was elected a Scholar in 2001 and graduated in 2003. He earned a PhD from Cambridge University in 2009.

In 2019 he moved to California Institute of Technology, having been a fellow of Wadham College, Oxford and Professor of Discrete Mathematics in the Mathematics Institute at the University of Oxford.

Conlon has worked in Ramsey theory, and he proved the first superpolynomial improvement on the Erdős–Szekeres bound on diagonal Ramsey numbers. He won the European Prize in Combinatorics in 2011, for his work in Ramsey theory and for his progress on Sidorenko's conjecture that, for any bipartite graph H, uniformly random graphons have the fewest subgraphs isomorphic to H when the edge density is fixed. He was awarded the Whitehead Prize in 2019 "in recognition of his many contributions to combinatorics".

From 2015 to 2020, Conlon was the Editor-in-Chief of the Electronic Journal of Combinatorics.
