= Ω-complete theory =

Property of an arithmetical theory

In mathematical logic, an ω-complete theory is a formal theory in first-order logic, containing arithmetic, such that whenever it proves every natural number instance of a formula, it also proves the corresponding universal sentence. A theory with the complementary property is called ω-incomplete. The ω in the name refers to the set of natural numbers.

The terminology was established in the 1958 paper The Classical and the ω-Complete Arithmetic by Andrzej Grzegorczyk, Andrzej Mostowski, and Czesław Ryll-Nardzewski.

== Definition ==
Consider a first-order language that contains terms for the natural numbers $\bar 0, \bar 1, \bar 2, \ldots$. For example, the standard language for Peano arithmetic contains the two symbols $0, S$, with which we can write down the terms for all the natural numbers: $0, S0, SS0, \dots$.

Let $T$ be a theory in the language. $T$ is ω-complete iff, for every formula $\varphi(x)$ with one free variable,
$$T \vdash \varphi(\bar n) \text{ for every } n \in \omega
\quad\Longrightarrow\quad
T \vdash \forall x\,\varphi(x).$$
The implication may appear obvious. However, one must distinguish between $\vdash$, which is a consequence within the object-theory, and $\implies$, which is a consequence in the meta-theory. A theory is ω-complete if it can perform this consequence within the object-theory, rather than perform it outside in the meta-theory.

== Examples ==
It is possible for a theory to be ω-incomplete, because the theory may have a model $\mathcal M$ with non-standard integers. In the model, we can have $\mathcal M \models \varphi(\bar 0), \mathcal M \models \varphi(\bar 1), \dots$, but nevertheless have $\mathcal M \not\models \varphi(c)$ for a certain non-standard integer $c$ in the model.

A standard weak example is Robinson arithmetic $Q$. It proves each instance of $0+\bar n=\bar n$, while the universal sentence $\forall x(0+x=x)$ lies beyond its theorems. This can be computably demonstrated by building a computable nonstandard model of $Q$, in which $0 + c \neq 0$ for a non-standard integer element $c$. Accordingly, $Q$ is ω-incomplete.

Peano arithmetic repairs many weak failures of that kind, yet standard incompleteness arguments still yield ω-incompleteness under the usual consistency assumption. In particular, Gödel's second incompleteness theorem provide an example. Consider a Gödel numbering of all proofs in PA, and let $\varphi(\bar n)$ to mean "If number $n$ is a valid proof in PA, then its conclusion is not $0 = 1$". Then, $PA\vdash \varphi(\bar 0), PA\vdash \varphi(\bar 1), \dots$, but $PA\not\vdash \forall x \varphi(x)$ by incompleteness. This argument applies to any recursively axiomatized theory that contains PA.

== Relation to nearby notions ==
ω-completeness is closely related to ω-consistency. A theory is ω-consistent when no formula $\psi(x)$ yields both the existential sentence $\exists x\,\psi(x)$ and every numeral instance $\neg\psi(\bar n)$. The two notions mark different syntactic patterns in the study of formal theories.

By the completeness theorem, a consistent theory is ω-incomplete if and only if it can be extended to a consistent but ω-inconsistent theory.

ω-completeness is also connected with the ω-rule,
$$A(0), A(1), A(2), \ldots \;\Rightarrow\; \forall n\,A(n).$$
Proof systems using the ω-rule build the passage from all numeral instances to the universal conclusion directly into the proof system.

== See also ==
- Gödel's incompleteness theorems
- Peano arithmetic
- ω-consistency
- ω-rule
