= Wei-Yin Loh =

Singaporean-American statistician

Wei-Yin Loh is a Singaporean statistician.

Loh obtained his Bachelor of Science in mathematics with first-class honours at the University of Singapore in 1974. He remained at the University of Singapore until 1977 to complete a Master of Science in the same subject, then enrolled at the University of California, Berkeley for a PhD in statistics. Loh completed his doctoral dissertation, "Tail-orderings on Symmetric Distributions with Statistical Applications", under the supervision of Erich Leo Lehmann in 1982.

Loh is a professor of statistics at the University of Wisconsin–Madison. He was elected a fellow of the Institute of Mathematical Statistics in 1991, and to an equivalent honour by the American Statistical Association in 1998.

Loh is the father of Po-Shen Loh, a mathematician at Carnegie Mellon University and coach of the US International Mathematical Olympiad team, Po-Ling Loh, a statistician at the University of Cambridge, and Po-Ru Loh, an associate professor of medicine at Harvard University. His brother, Wei-Liem Loh, is a statistician at the National University of Singapore.
