= Po-Ling Loh =

American statistician

Po-Ling Loh (born 1987) is an American statistician who works in England as a professor in the Statistical Laboratory of the Department of Pure Mathematics and Mathematical Statistics at the University of Cambridge, a Fellow of St. John's College, Cambridge, and College Lecturer in Mathematical Sciences. Her research involves the theory of high-dimensional statistics including M-estimators, robust statistics, differential privacy, and the applications of non-convex optimisation in high-dimensional statistics.

== Education and career ==
Loh was born near New York City, where her father (a professor at the University of Wisconsin–Madison) was on sabbatical; she grew up near the university in Madison, Wisconsin. As a student at James Madison Memorial High School, she became a 2005 finalist in the Intel Science Talent Search. Her project, in the mathematics of group theory, was titled Closure properties of $D_{2p}$ in finite groups, and described research that she performed at the California Institute of Technology (CalTech) under the direction of Michael Aschbacher.

She continued at CalTech as an undergraduate, majoring in mathematics with a minor in English. She graduated in 2009, and became a graduate student at the University of California, Berkeley. There, she received a master's degree in computer science in 2013, and completed her Ph.D. in statistics in 2014. Her dissertation, High-dimensional statistics with systematically corrupted data, was supervised by Martin Wainwright.

She became an assistant professor of statistics in the Wharton School of the University of Pennsylvania from 2014 to 2016, and moved to the University of Wisconsin–Madison as an assistant professor of electrical and computer engineering in 2016. She changed departments, moving to the Department of Statistics, in 2018, and was promoted to associate professor in 2019. In 2021 she joined the University of Cambridge as a lecturer, and in 2022 was promoted to professor. She has been a Fellow of St. John's College since 2023.

== Recognition ==
For her performance in the 2005 Intel Science Talent Search, minor planet 21432 Polingloh was named for Loh.

Loh received a National Science Foundation CAREER Award in 2018, the Army Research Office Young Investigator Award in 2019, and a Philip Leverhulme Prize in 2023.

She received both the Tweedie New Researcher Award of the Institute of Mathematical Statistics, "novel contributions in non-convex optimization, robust statistics, and statistical modeling and inference of random graphs and networks", and the New Researcher Award of the Bernoulli Society in 2019. She is the 2025 recipient of the Ethel Newbold Prize of the Bernoulli Society.

In 2025, Loh was named a Fellow of the Institute of Mathematical Statistics, "for fundamental contributions to high-dimensional statistics and machine learning, in particular, the study of non-convex penalized estimators, robust statistics, network inference and differential privacy, and for substantial contributions to the profession through work with statistical societies and editorial service".

== Family ==
Loh is the daughter of Wei-Yin Loh, a Singaporean statistician at the University of Wisconsin. Her brothers are Po-Shen Loh, a mathematician at Carnegie Mellon University and coach of the US International Mathematical Olympiad team, and Po-Ru Loh, an associate professor of medicine at Harvard University. Her uncle, Wei-Liem Loh, is a statistician at the National University of Singapore.
