= Union-closed sets conjecture =

1979 conjecture in combinatorics

Unsolved problem in mathematics
If any two sets in some finite family of sets have a union that also belongs to the family, must some element belong to at least half of the sets in the family?
More unsolved problems in mathematics

A hypergraph representing a family of union-closed sets. Vertices 1 and 2 (highlighted red and blue respectively) are present in over half the edges.

The union-closed sets conjecture, also known as Frankl’s conjecture, is an open problem in combinatorics posed by Péter Frankl in 1979. A family of sets is said to be union-closed if the union of any two sets from the family belongs to the family. The conjecture states:

For every finite union-closed family of sets, other than the empty family, there exists an element that belongs to at least half of the sets in the family.

Professor Timothy Gowers has called this "one of the best known open problems in combinatorics" and has said that the conjecture "feels as though it ought to be easy (and as a result has attracted a lot of false proofs over the years). A good way to understand why it isn't easy is to spend an afternoon trying to prove it. That clever averaging argument you had in mind doesn't work ..."

== Example ==
The family of sets

$$\varnothing, \{1\}, \{1,2\}, \{2,3,4\}, \{1,2,3,4\}$$

consists of five different sets and is union-closed. The element $1$ is contained in three of the five sets (and so is the element $2$), thus the conjecture holds in this case.

== Basic results ==
It is easy to show that if a union-closed family contains a singleton $\{a\}$ (as in the example above), then the element $a$ must occur in at least half of the sets of the family.

If there is a counterexample to the conjecture, then there is also a counterexample consisting only of finite sets. Therefore, without loss of generality, we will assume that all sets in the given union-closed family are finite.

Given a finite non-empty set $U$, the power set $P(U)$ consisting of all subsets of $U$ is union-closed. Each element of $U$ is contained in exactly half of the subsets of $U$. Therefore, in general we cannot ask for an element contained in more than half of the sets of the family: the bound of the conjecture is sharp.

== Equivalent forms ==
=== Intersection formulation ===
The union-closed set conjecture is true if and only if a set system $X$ which is intersection-closed contains an element of $U(X)$ in at most half of the sets of $X$, where $U(X)$ is the universe set, i.e. the union of all members of the system $X$.

The following facts show the equivalence.

Firstly, we show that a set system is union-closed if and only if its complement is intersection-closed.

Lemma: If $X$ is a union-closed family of sets with universe $U(X)$, the family of complement sets to sets in $X$ is closed under intersection.

Proof: We define the complement of the set system $X$ as $X^c := \{U(X) - S : S \in X\}$. Let $X_1$, $X_2$ be arbitrary sets in $X$ and so $U(X) - X_1$ and $U(X) - X_2$ are both in $X^c$. Since $X$ is union-closed, $X_1 \cup X_2 = X_3$ is in $X$, and therefore the complement of $X_3$, $U(X) - X_3$ is in $X^c$, the elements in neither $X_1$, nor $X_2$. This is exactly the intersection of the complements of $X_1$ and $X_2$, $(U(X)-X_1) \cap (U(X)-X_2)$. Therefore, $X$ is union-closed if and only if the complement of $X$, $X^c$ is intersection closed.

Secondly, note that a set system contains an element in half of its sets if and only if its complement set system contains it in at most half of its sets. Therefore, if $X$ is a union-closed family of sets, the family of complement sets to sets in $X$ relative to the universe $U(X)$ is closed under intersection, and an element that belongs to at least half of the sets of $X$ belongs to at most half of the complement sets. Thus, an equivalent form of the conjecture (the form in which it was originally stated) is that, for any intersection-closed family of sets that contains more than one set, there exists an element that belongs to at most half of the sets in the family.

=== Lattice formulation ===
Although stated above in terms of families of sets, Frankl's conjecture has also been formulated and studied as a question in lattice theory. A lattice is a partially ordered set in which for two elements x and y there is a unique greatest element less than or equal to both of them (the meet of x and y) and a unique least element greater than or equal to both of them (the join of x and y). The family of all subsets of a set S, ordered by set inclusion, forms a lattice in which the meet is represented by the set-theoretic intersection and the join is represented by the set-theoretic union; a lattice formed in this way is called a Boolean lattice. The lattice-theoretic version of Frankl's conjecture is that in any finite lattice there exists an element x that is not the join of any two smaller elements, and such that the number of elements greater than or equal to x totals at most half the lattice, with equality only if the lattice is a Boolean lattice. As Abe (2000) shows, this statement about lattices is equivalent to the Frankl conjecture for union-closed sets: each lattice can be translated into a union-closed set family, and each union-closed set family can be translated into a lattice, such that the truth of the Frankl conjecture for the translated object implies the truth of the conjecture for the original object. This lattice-theoretic version of the conjecture is known to be true for several natural subclasses of lattices but remains open in the general case.

=== Proof of equivalence ===
Let L be a finite lattice, and let J(L) denote the set of join-irreducible elements of L. For each element $x \in L$, define $T_x = \{ j \in J(L) : j \le x \}.$

The map $x \mapsto T_x$ is injective, because in a finite lattice every element is the join of the join-irreducible elements below it. Thus, if $T_x = T_y$, then x and y have the same join-irreducible elements below them, and therefore $x=y$. It follows that the family $\mathcal{F}=\{T_x : x\in L\}$ has cardinality $|L|$.

Moreover, $\mathcal{F}$ is intersection-closed. Indeed, for any $x,y\in L$, $j\le x\wedge y$ if and only if $j\le x$ and $j\le y$, so $T_{x\wedge y}=T_x\cap T_y.$

Assume now that every finite intersection-closed family has an element contained in at most half of its sets. Applying this statement to $\mathcal{F}$, there exists some $j\in J(L)$ such that j belongs to at most half of the sets $T_x$. But $j\in T_x$ holds exactly when $j\le x$. Therefore the number of members of $\mathcal{F}$ containing j is exactly the number of elements of L lying above j, namely $|\uparrow j|$, where $\uparrow j = \{x\in L : j\le x\}.$ Hence $|\uparrow j|\le \frac{|L|}{2}.$ This proves the lattice-theoretic statement.

For the converse, let $\mathcal{A}$ be a finite intersection-closed family of sets. Ordered by inclusion, $\mathcal{A}$ is a finite lattice in which the meet is set intersection and the join of two elements is the least member of $\mathcal{A}$ containing their union. Assume that every finite lattice contains a join-irreducible element j such that $|\uparrow j|\le \frac{|L|}{2}.$ Applying this to the lattice $L=\mathcal{A}$, choose such a join-irreducible element j.

Because j is join-irreducible in a finite lattice, it has a unique lower cover, denoted $j_*$. Choose an element $a \in j\setminus j_*.$ Such an element exists because $j_* \subsetneq j$.

It is then claimed that every member of $\mathcal{A}$ containing a lies above j. Let $A\in\mathcal{A}$ and suppose $a\in A$. If $j\nsubseteq A$, then $j\wedge A = j\cap A$ is a proper subset of j, and hence $j\wedge A \le j_*.$ But $a\in j$ and $a\in A$, so $a\in j\cap A = j\wedge A$, which would imply $a\in j_*$, contrary to the choice of a. Therefore $j\subseteq A$, that is, $j\le A$ in the lattice order.

So every set in $\mathcal{A}$ containing a belongs to $\uparrow j$. Conversely, if $A\in\uparrow j$, then $j\subseteq A$, and since $a\in j$, the set A contains a. Thus the sets in $\mathcal{A}$ containing a are exactly the elements of $\uparrow j$.

It follows that the number of members of $\mathcal{A}$ containing a is $|\uparrow j| \le \frac{|\mathcal{A}|}{2}.$ Therefore a belongs to at most half of the sets in $\mathcal{A}$. This proves the intersection-closed formulation.

=== Graph-theoretic formulation ===
Another equivalent formulation of the union-closed sets conjecture uses graph theory. In an undirected graph, an Independent set is a set of vertices no two of which are adjacent to each other; an independent set is maximal if it is not a subset of a larger independent set. In any graph, the "heavy" vertices that appear in more than half of the maximal independent sets must themselves form an independent set. So, if the graph is non-empty, there always exists at least one non-heavy vertex, a vertex that appears in at most half of the maximal independent sets. The graph formulation of the union-closed sets conjecture states that every finite non-empty graph contains two adjacent non-heavy vertices. It is automatically true when the graph contains an odd cycle, because the independent set of all heavy vertices cannot cover all the edges of the cycle. Therefore, the more interesting case of the conjecture is for bipartite graphs, which have no odd cycles. Another equivalent formulation of the conjecture is that, in every bipartite graph, there exist two vertices, one on each side of the bipartition, such that each of these two vertices belongs to at most half of the graph's maximal independent sets. This conjecture is known to hold for chordal bipartite graphs, bipartite series–parallel graphs, and bipartite graphs of maximum degree three.

== Partial results ==
The conjecture has been proven for many special cases of union-closed set families. In particular, it is known to be true for

- families of at most 50 sets,
- families of sets whose union has at most 12 elements,
- families of sets in which the smallest set has one or two elements,
- families of at least $(\tfrac{1}{2}-\varepsilon)2^n$ subsets of an $n$-element set, for some constant $\varepsilon>0$, according to an unpublished preprint.
- families of sets with short chain no more than 3 or long chain no less than $n-1$.

Additionally, for every union-closed family, other than the family containing only the empty set, there exists an element that belongs to at least $0.38271$ of the sets in the family. The proof of this was built upon the work of Gilmer who showed the first constant bound of $0.01$ which was improved by others the same week to $\frac{3-\sqrt{5}}{2}\approx 0.381966$.

== History ==
Péter Frankl stated the conjecture in terms of intersection-closed set families in 1979, and so the conjecture is usually credited to him and is sometimes referred to as the Frankl conjecture. The earliest publication of the union-closed version of the conjecture appears to be by Duffus (1985). A history of the work on the conjecture up to 2013 was published by Bruhn & Schaudt (2015).
