= Jacob Fox =

American mathematician

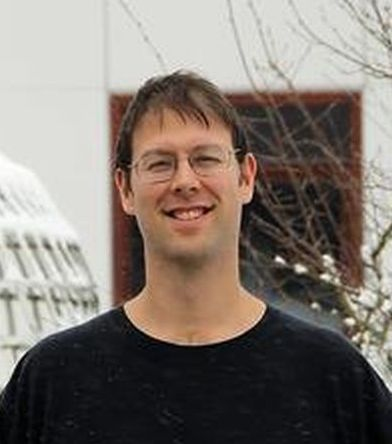
- Fox at Oberwolfach in 2016
- Born: April 7, 1984 (age 42); Israel
- Education: Princeton University; MIT
- Known for: Combinatorics
- Spouse: Kathy Lin
- Awards: Morgan Prize (2006); Dénes Kőnig Prize (2010); Oberwolfach Prize (2016); Presidential Early Career Award for Scientists and Engineers (2014)
- Scientific career
- Fields: Mathematics
- Workplaces: Stanford University
- Doctoral advisor: Benny Sudakov

Jacob Fox (born Jacob Licht; 1984) is an American mathematician. He is a professor at Stanford University. His research interests are in Hungarian-style combinatorics, particularly Ramsey theory, extremal graph theory, combinatorial number theory, and probabilistic methods in combinatorics.

Fox grew up in West Hartford, Connecticut and attended Hall High School. As a senior he won second place overall and first place in his category in the annual Intel Science Talent Search, also winning the Karl Menger Memorial Prize of the American Mathematical Society for his project. The project was titled "Rainbow Ramsey Theory: Rainbow Arithmetic Progressions and Anti-Ramsey Results" and was based on a research project he did at a six-week summer camp in mathematics, the Research Science Institute (RSI), at the Massachusetts Institute of Technology (MIT). He also participated in an earlier high school mathematics program at Ohio State University.

Fox became an undergraduate at MIT, and was awarded the 2006 Morgan Prize for several research publications in combinatorics.

Fox completed his PhD in 2010 from Princeton University; his dissertation, supervised by Benny Sudakov, was titled Ramsey Numbers.

Fox worked in the mathematics department at MIT from 2010 to 2014, where he continued to teach classes relating to combinatorics. He was also one of the mentors at the Research Science Institute summer program. He joined the faculty of Stanford University in 2015.

In 2010, Fox was awarded the Dénes Kőnig Prize, an early-career award of the Society for Industrial and Applied Mathematics Activity Group on Discrete Mathematics. He was an invited speaker at the International Congress of Mathematicians in 2014. He was awarded the Oberwolfach Prize in 2016. He was named as a Fellow of the American Mathematical Society, in its 2027 class of fellows.
