= Robert Morris (mathematician) =

Robert Morris is a mathematician who works in combinatorics, probability, graph theory and Ramsey theory. He is a researcher at IMPA.

He graduated with a Ph.D. from the University of Memphis in 2006 under the supervision of Béla Bollobás.

In 2015, Morris was awarded the European Prize in Combinatorics for "his profound results in extremal and probabilistic combinatorics particularly for his result on independent sets in hypergraphs which found immediately several applications in additive number theory and combinatorics, such as the solution of old problem of Erdős and for establishing tight bounds for Ramsey numbers, and also on random cellular automata and bootstrap problems in percolation."

In 2016, he was one of the winners of the George Pólya Prize.

In 2018, he was awarded the Fulkerson Prize. Also in 2018, he was an invited speaker at the International Congress of Mathematicians in Rio de Janeiro.

In 2024, Morris received the Leroy P. Steele Prize for Seminal Contribution to Research jointly with József Balogh and Wojciech Samotij. He was elected a Fellow of the Royal Society in 2026.
