= Jeong Han Kim =

South Korean mathematician (born 1962)

- Hangul: 김정한
- RR: Gim Jeonghan
- MR: Kim Chŏnghan

Jeong Han Kim (Korean: 김정한; born July 20, 1962) is a South Korean mathematician. He studied physics and mathematical physics at Yonsei University, and earned his Ph.D. in mathematics at Rutgers University. He was a researcher at AT&T Bell Labs and at Microsoft Research, and was Underwood Chair Professor of Mathematics at Yonsei University. He is currently a Professor of the School of Computational Sciences at the Korea Institute for Advanced Study.

His main research fields are combinatorics and computational mathematics. His best known contribution to the field is his proof that the Ramsey number R(3,t) has asymptotic order of magnitude t^{2}/log t. He received the Fulkerson Prize in 1997 for his contributions to Ramsey theory.

In 2008, he became president of the National Institute for Mathematical Sciences of South Korea and was also awarded the Kyung-Ahm Prize. He was discharged of the position in 2011 after being accused of having allegedly misappropriated research funds. However, he was found not guilty by prosecution's investigation. In 2020, he received the Samil Prize.
