= Benny Sudakov =

Israeli mathematician

- בני סודקוב
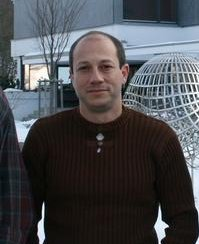
- Benny Sudakov in 2011
- Born: October 1969 (age 56); Tbilisi, Georgian Soviet Socialist Republic
- Citizenship: Israel
- Education: Tbilisi State University; Tel Aviv University
- Scientific career
- Fields: Mathematics
- Workplaces: UCLA; Princeton University; Institute for Advanced Study; ETH Zurich
- Thesis: Extremal Problems in Probabilistic Combinatorics and Their Algorithmic Aspects (1999)
- Doctoral advisor: Noga Alon
- Doctoral students: Jacob Fox; Hao Huang; Peter Keevash; Po-Shen Loh

Benny Sudakov (Hebrew: בני סודקוב; born October 1969) is an Israeli mathematician, who works mainly on extremal and probabilistic combinatorics.

== Biography ==
Sudakov was born in Tbilisi, Georgia, and completed his undergraduate studies at Tbilisi State University in 1990. After emigrating to Israel, he received his PhD from Tel Aviv University in 1999, under the supervision of Noga Alon. From 1999 until 2002, he held a Veblen Research Instructorship, a joint position between Princeton University and the Institute for Advanced Study. Until 2007, he was an assistant professor at Princeton University. Until 2014, he was a professor at the University of California, Los Angeles. In July 2013, Sudakov joined ETH Zurich as a professor.

Sudakov has broad interests within the field of combinatorics, having written papers on extremal combinatorics, Ramsey theory, random graphs, and positional games.

In 2012, he became a Fellow of the American Mathematical Society. He gave an invited talk at the International Congress of Mathematicians in 2010 at Hyderabad, on the topic of "Combinatorics".
