= Extremal combinatorics =

Area of combinatorics

Extremal combinatorics is a field of combinatorics, which is itself a part of mathematics. Extremal combinatorics studies how large or how small a collection of finite objects (numbers, graphs, vectors, sets, etc.) can be, if it has to satisfy certain restrictions.

Much of extremal combinatorics concerns classes of sets; this is called extremal set theory. For instance, in an n-element set, what is the largest number of k-element subsets that can pairwise intersect one another? What is the largest number of subsets of which none contains any other? The latter question is answered by Sperner's theorem, which gave rise to much of extremal set theory.

Another kind of example: How many people can be invited to a party where among each three people there are two who know each other and two who don't know each other? Ramsey theory shows that at most five persons can attend such a party (see Theorem on Friends and Strangers). Or, suppose we are given a finite set of nonzero integers, and are asked to mark as large a subset as possible of this set under the restriction that the sum of any two marked integers cannot be marked. It appears that (independent of what the given integers actually are) we can always mark at least one-third of them.

== See also ==
- Extremal graph theory
- Sauer–Shelah lemma
- Erdős–Ko–Rado theorem
- Kruskal–Katona theorem
- Fisher's inequality
- Union-closed sets conjecture
