= Erdős–Szemerédi theorem =

Theorem in arithmetic combinatorics

In arithmetic combinatorics, the Erdős–Szemerédi theorem states that for every finite set $A$ of integers, at least one of the sets $A+A$ and $A\cdot A$ (the sets of pairwise sums and pairwise products, respectively) form a significantly larger set. More precisely, the Erdős–Szemerédi theorem states that there exist positive constants $c$ and $\varepsilon$ such that, for any non-empty set $A\subset\N$,

$$\max( |A+A|, |A \cdot A| ) \geq c |A|^{1+\varepsilon}.$$

It was proved by Paul Erdős and Endre Szemerédi in 1983. The notation $|A|$ denotes the cardinality of the set $A$.

The set of pairwise sums is $A+A=\{a+b:a,b\in A\}$ and is called the sumset of $A$.

The set of pairwise products is $A\cdot A=\{a\cdot b:a,b\in A\}$ and is called the product set of $A$; it is also written $AA$.

The theorem is a version of the maxim that additive structure and multiplicative structure cannot coexist. It can also be viewed as an assertion that the real line does not contain any set resembling a finite subring or finite subfield; it is the first example of what is now known as the sum-product phenomenon, which is now known to hold in a wide variety of rings and fields, including finite fields.

== Sum-product conjecture ==
The sum-product conjecture informally says that one of the sum set or the product set of any set must be nearly as large as possible. It was originally conjectured by Erdős in 1974 to hold whether $A$ is a set of integers, reals, or complex numbers. More precisely, it proposes that, for any set $A\subset\C$, one has

$$\max(|A+A|,|A \cdot A|) \geq |A|^{2-o(1)}.$$

The asymptotic parameter in the $o(1)$ little o notation is $|A|$.

=== Disproving the conjecture ===
This conjecture was disproved over the reals (and hence the complex numbers) in 2026 by Bloom, Sawin, Schildkraut, and Zhelezov, who constructed arbitrarily large sets $A\subset R$ of algebraic integers in number fields of degree proportional to $\log|A|$ such that

$$\max(|A+A|,|A \cdot A|) \leq |A|^{2-c}$$

for an absolute constant $c>0$. The same paper disproves the many sums and products conjecture and obtains analogous constructions over p-adic numbers, finite fields, and function fields in positive characteristic. The conjecture remains open over the integers.

== Examples ==
If $A=\{1,2,3,\dots,n\}$, then $|A+A|=2|A|-1\O(|A|)$ using Big O notation, with $|A|$ the asymptotic parameter. Informally, this says that the sum set of $A$ grows only proportionally to $A$. On the other hand, the product set of $A$ satisfies a bound of the form $|A\cdot A|\ge|A|^{2-\varepsilon}$ for all $\varepsilon>0$ and all sufficiently large $n$. This is related to the Erdős multiplication table problem. The best lower bound on $|A\cdot A|$ for this set is due to Kevin Ford.

This example is an instance of the few sums, many products version of the sum-product problem of György Elekes and Imre Z. Ruzsa. A consequence of their result is that any set with a small sumset (such as an arithmetic progression) has the lower bound on the product set

$$|A\cdot A|=\Omega\left(|A|^2\log^{-1}|A|\right).$$

Xu and Zhou proved more strongly that

$$|A\cdot A|=\Omega\left(|A|^2\log^{1-2\log 2-o(1)}|A|\right)$$

for any dense subset $A$ of an arithmetic progression in integers, which is sharp up to the $o(1)$ in the exponent.

As an example for the corresponding few products, many sums version of the problem, the set $B=\{2,4,8,\dots,2^n\}$ satisfies $|B\cdot B=2|B|-1$ but has many sums: $|B+B| = \tbinom{|B|+1}{2}$. This bound comes from considering the binary representation of a number. The set $B$ is an example of a geometric progression.

For a random set of $n$ numbers, both the product set and the sumset have cardinality $\tbinom{n+1}{2}$; that is, with high probability, neither the sumset nor the product set generates repeated elements.

=== Sharpness of the conjecture ===
Erdős and Szemerédi give an example of a sufficiently smooth set of integers $A$ with the bound

$$\max\{|A+A|,|A\cdot A|\} \leq |A|^{2} e^{-\frac{c \log|A|}{\log\log|A|} }.$$

This shows that the $o(1)$ term in the conjecture is necessary.

=== Extremal cases ===
Often studied are the extreme cases of the hypothesis:

- few sums, many product (FSMP): if $|A+A\ll|A|$, then $|A\cdot A|\ge|A|^{2-o(1)}$, and
- few products, many sums (FPMS): if $|A\cdot A|\ll|A|$, then $|A+A|\ge|A|^{2-o(1)}$.

== History and current results ==
The following table summarizes progress on the sum-product problem over the reals. The exponents 1/4 of György Elekes and 1/3 of József Solymosi are considered milestone results within the citing literature. All improvements after 2009 are of the form $\tfrac13+c$, and represent refinements of the arguments of Konyagin and Shkredov.

Exponent $\delta$ where $\max(|A+A|,|A\cdot A|)\ge|A|^{1+\delta-o(1)}$ for $A\subset\R$
Year	Exponent	Author(s)	Comments
1983	non-explicit $\delta>0$	Erdős and Szemerédi	Only for $A\subset\Z$ and of the form $1+\delta$ instead of $1+\delta-o(1)$.
1997	$\tfrac{1}{31}$	Nathanson	Only for $A\subset\Z$ and of the form $1+\delta$ instead of $1+\delta-o(1)$.
1998	$\tfrac{1}{15}$	Ford	Only for $A\subset\Z$ and of the form $1+\delta$ instead of $1+\delta-o(1)$.
1997	$\tfrac{1}{4}$	Elekes	Of the form $1+\delta-o(1)$. Valid also over $\C$.
2005	$\tfrac{3}{11}$	Solymosi	Valid also over $\C$.
2009	$\tfrac{1}{3}$	Solymosi	
2015	$\tfrac{1}{3}+\tfrac{1}{20598}\approx 0.333381$	Konyagin and Shkredov	
2016	$\tfrac{1}{3}+\tfrac{5}{9813}\approx 0.333842$	Konyagin and Shkredov	
2016	$\tfrac{1}{3}+\tfrac{1}{1509}\approx 0.333996$	Rudnev, Shkredov and Stevens	
2019	$\tfrac{1}{3}+\tfrac{5}{5277}\approx 0.334280$	Shakan	
2020	$\tfrac{1}{3}+\tfrac{2}{1167}\approx 0.335047$	Rudnev and Stevens	
2025	$\tfrac{1}{3}+\tfrac{2}{951}\approx 0.335436$	Bloom	Current record

=== Complex numbers ===
Proof techniques involving only the Szemerédi–Trotter theorem extend automatically to the complex numbers, since the Szemerédi-Trotter theorem holds over $\C^2$ by a theorem of Tóth. Konyagin and Rudnev matched the exponent of $\tfrac43$ over the complex numbers. The results with exponents of the form $\tfrac43+c$ have not been matched over the complex numbers.

== Over finite fields ==
The sum-product problem is particularly well studied over finite fields. Motivated by the finite field Kakeya conjecture, Wolff conjectured that when $p$ is a (large) prime, for every subset $A\subseteq\mathbb{F}_p$, the inequality $\max(|A+A|,|A\cdot A|)\ge\min(p,|A|^{1+\varepsilon})$ holds for an absolute constant $\varepsilon>0$. This conjecture had also been formulated in the 1990s by Wigderson, motivated by randomness extractors.

Note that the sum-product problem cannot hold in finite fields unconditionally due to the following example:

Example: Let $\mathbb{F}$ be a finite field and take $A=\mathbb{F}$. Then since $\mathbb{F}$ is closed under addition and multiplication, $A+A=A\cdot A=\mathbb{F}$, and so $|A+A|=|A\cdot A|=|A|$. This pathological example extends to taking $A$ to be any sub-field of the field in question.

Qualitatively, the sum-product problem has been solved over finite fields:

Theorem (Bourgain, Katz, Tao (2004)): Let $p$ be prime and let $A\subset\mathbb{F}_p$ with $p^{\delta}<|A|<p^{1-\delta}$ for some $0<\delta<1$. Then $\max(|A+A|,|A\cdot A|)\ge c_\delta|A|^{1+\varepsilon}$ for some $\varepsilon=\varepsilon(\delta)>0$.

Bourgain, Katz, and Tao extended this theorem to arbitrary fields. Informally, the following theorem says that if a sufficiently large set does not grow under either addition or multiplication, then it is mostly contained in a dilate of a sub-field.

Theorem (Bourgain, Katz, Tao (2004)): Let $A$ be a subset of a finite field $\mathbb{F}$ so that $|A|>|\mathbb{F}|^{\delta}$ for some $0<\delta<1$, and suppose that $|A+A|,|A\cdot A|\le K|A|$. Then there exists a sub-field $G\subset \mathbb{F}$ with $|G|\le K^{C_\delta}|A|$, an element $x\in\mathbb{F}\setminus\{0\}$, and a set $X\subset \mathbb{F}$ with $|X|\le K^{C_\delta}$ so that $A\subseteq xG\cup X$.

They suggest that the constant $C_\delta$ may be independent of $\delta$.

Quantitative results towards the finite field sum-product problem in $\mathbb{F}$ typically fall into two categories: when $A\subset\mathbb{F}$ is small or large with respect to the characteristic of $\mathbb{F}$. This is because different types of techniques are used in each setting.

=== Small sets ===
In this regime, let $\mathbb{F}$ be a field of characteristic $p$. Note that the field is not always finite. When this is the case, and the characteristic of $\mathbb{F}$ is zero, then the $p$-constraint is omitted.

Exponent $\delta$ where $\max(|A+A|,|A\cdot A|)\ge|A|^{1+\delta-o(1)}$ for $A\subset\mathbb{F}$
Year	Exponent	$p$-constraint: $|A|<p^c$	Author(s)	Comments
2004	unquantified	$c<1$	Bourgain, Katz, Tao	For finite $\mathbb{F}$ only
2007	$\tfrac{1}{14}$	$c=\tfrac{7}{13}$	Garaev	For finite $\mathbb{F}$ only. The $p$-constraint involves a factor of $\log|A|$
2008	$\tfrac{1}{13}$	$c=\tfrac{1}{2}$	Katz, Shen	For finite $\mathbb{F}$ only
2009	$\tfrac{1}{12}$	$c=\tfrac{12}{23}$	Bourgain, Garaev	For finite 𝔽 only. $o(1)$ removed by Li.
2012	$\tfrac{1}{11}$	$c=\tfrac{1}{2}$	Rudnev	For finite $\mathbb{F}$ only
2016	$\tfrac{1}{5}$	$c=\tfrac{5}{8}$	Roche-Newton, Rudnev, Shkredov	
2016	$\tfrac{1}{9}$	$c=\tfrac{18}{35}$	Rudnev, Shkredov, Shakan	This result is the best of three contemporaneous results.
2021	$\tfrac{1}{4}$	$c=\tfrac{1}{2}$	Mohammadi, Stevens	Current record. Extends to difference sets and ratio sets.

In fields with non-prime order, the $p$-constraint on $A\subset\mathbb{F}$ can be replaced with the assumption that $A$ does not have too large an intersection with any subfield. The best work in this direction is due to Li and Roche-Newton attaining an exponent of $\delta=\tfrac{1}{19}$ in the notation of the above table.

=== Large sets ===
When $\mathbb{F}\subset\mathbb{F}_p$ for $p$ prime, the sum-product problem is considered resolved due to the following result of Garaev:

Theorem (Garaev (2007)): Let $A\subset\mathbb{F}_p$. Then
$$\max(|A+A|,|A\cdot A|\gg\min(p^{1/2}|A|^{1/2},|A|^2p^{-1/2}).$$

This is optimal in the range $|A|\ge p^{2/3}$.

This result was extended to finite fields of non-prime order by Vinh in 2011.

== Variants and generalizations ==
=== Other combinations of operators ===
Bourgain and Chang proved unconditional growth for sets $A\subset\Z$, as long as one considers enough sums or products:

Theorem (Bourgain, Chang (2003)): Let $b\in\N$. Then there exists $k\in\N$ so that for all $A\subset\Z$, one has
$$\begin{align}\max\left(|kA|,|A^{(k)}|\right)
&=\max\left(|A+A+\cdots+A|,|A\cdot A\cdot\cdots\cdot A|\right)\\
&\ge|A|^b.
\end{align}$$

In many works, addition and multiplication are combined in one expression. With the motto addition and multiplication cannot coexist, one expects that any non-trivial combination of addition and multiplication of a set should guarantee growth. Note that in finite settings, or in fields with non-trivial subfields, such a statement requires further constraints.

Sets of interest include (results for $A\subset\R$):

- $A\cdot A+A$: Stevens and Warren show that

$$|A\cdot A+A|\gg|A|^{\tfrac{3}{2}+\tfrac{3}{170}-o(1)}.$$

- $A\cdot(A+A)$: Murphy, Roche-Newton and Shkredov show that

$$\left|A\cdot(A+A)\right|\gg|A|^{\tfrac{3}{2}+\tfrac{5}{242}-o(1)}.$$

- $A\cdot(A+1)$: Stevens and Warren show that

$$\left|A\cdot(A+1)\right|\gg|A|^{\tfrac{49}{38}-o(1)}.$$

- $(A\cdot A)+(A\cdot A)$: Stevens and Rudnev show that

$$\left|(A\cdot A)+(A\cdot A)\right|\gg|A|^{\tfrac{127}{80}-o(1)}.$$

== See also ==
- Sum-free set
- Restricted sumset
- Additive combinatorics
- Additive number theory
- Multiplicative number theory
