= Discrete Analysis =

- Discipline: Pure mathematics
- Language: English
- Edited by: Ernie Croot, Ben Green, Timothy Gowers, Gil Kalai, Nets Hawk Katz, Bryna Kra, Izabella Łaba, Tom Sanders, József Solymosi, Terence Tao, Julia Wolf, Tamar Ziegler

Publication details
- History: 2016–present
- Publisher: Discrete Analysis
- Frequency: Continuous
- Open access: Yes
- License: CC BY

Standard abbreviations
- ISO 4: Discrete Anal.

Indexing
- ISSN: 2397-3129

Links
- Journal homepage

Discrete Analysis is a mathematics journal covering the applications of analysis to discrete structures. Discrete Analysis is an arXiv overlay journal, meaning the journal's content is hosted on the arXiv.

== History ==
Discrete Analysis was created by Timothy Gowers to demonstrate that a high-quality mathematics journal could be inexpensively produced outside of the traditional academic publishing industry. The journal is open access, and submissions are free for authors.

The journal's 2018 MCQ is 1.21.
