= Multiplicative number theory =

Multiplicative number theory is a subfield of analytic number theory that deals with prime numbers and with factorization and divisors. The focus is usually on developing approximate formulas for counting these objects in various contexts. The prime number theorem is a key result in this subject. The Mathematics Subject Classification for multiplicative number theory is 11Nxx.

== Scope ==
Multiplicative number theory deals primarily in asymptotic estimates for arithmetic functions. Historically the subject has been dominated by the prime number theorem, first by attempts to prove it and then by improvements in the error term. The Dirichlet divisor problem that estimates the average order of the divisor function d(n) and Gauss's circle problem that estimates the average order of the number of representations of a number as a sum of two squares are also classical problems, and again the focus is on improving the error estimates.

The distribution of primes numbers among residue classes modulo an integer is an area of active research. Dirichlet's theorem on primes in arithmetic progressions shows that there are an infinity of primes in each co-prime residue class, and the prime number theorem for arithmetic progressions shows that the primes are asymptotically equidistributed among the residue classes. The Bombieri–Vinogradov theorem gives a more precise measure of how evenly they are distributed. There is also much interest in the size of the smallest prime in an arithmetic progression; Linnik's theorem gives an estimate.

The twin prime conjecture, namely that there are an infinity of primes p such that p+2 is also prime, is the subject of active research. Chen's theorem shows that there are an infinity of primes p such that p+2 is either prime or the product of two primes.

== Methods ==
The methods belong primarily to analytic number theory, but elementary methods, especially sieve methods, are also very important. The large sieve and exponential sums are usually considered part of multiplicative number theory.

The distribution of prime numbers is closely tied to the behavior of the Riemann zeta function and the Riemann hypothesis, and these subjects are studied both from a number theory viewpoint and a complex analysis viewpoint.

== Standard texts ==
A large part of analytic number theory deals with multiplicative problems, and so most of its texts contain sections on multiplicative number theory. These are some well-known texts that deal specifically with multiplicative problems:

- Davenport, Harold (2000). Multiplicative Number Theory (3rd ed.). Berlin: Springer. ISBN 978-0-387-95097-6.
- Montgomery, Hugh; Robert C. Vaughan (2005). Multiplicative Number Theory I. Classical Theory. Cambridge: Cambridge University Press. ISBN 978-0-521-84903-6.

== See also ==
- Multiplicative combinatorics
- Additive combinatorics
- Additive number theory
- Sum-product phenomenon
