= Quasirandom group =

Group with no large product-free subset

In mathematics, a quasirandom group is a group that does not contain a large product-free subset. Such groups are precisely those without a small non-trivial irreducible representation. The namesake of these groups stems from their connection to graph theory: bipartite Cayley graphs over any subset of a quasirandom group are always bipartite quasirandom graphs.

== Motivation ==
The notion of quasirandom groups arises when considering subsets of groups for which no two elements in the subset have a product in the subset; such subsets are termed product-free. László Babai and Vera Sós asked about the existence of a constant $c$ for which every finite group $G$ with order $n$ has a product-free subset with size at least $cn$. A well-known result of Paul Erdős about sum-free sets of integers can be used to prove that $c = \frac{1}{3}$ suffices for abelian groups, but it turns out that such a constant does not exist for non-abelian groups.

Both non-trivial lower and upper bounds are now known for the size of the largest product-free subset of a group with order $n$. A lower bound of $cn^{\frac{11}{14}}$ can be proved by taking a large subset of a union of sufficiently many cosets, and an upper bound of $cn^{\frac{8}{9}}$ is given by considering the projective special linear group $\operatorname{PSL}(2, p)$ for any prime $p$. In the process of proving the upper bound, Timothy Gowers defined the notion of a quasirandom group to encapsulate the product-free condition and proved equivalences involving quasirandomness in graph theory.

== Graph quasirandomness ==
Formally, it does not make sense to talk about whether or not a single group is quasirandom. The strict definition of quasirandomness will apply to sequences of groups, but first bipartite graph quasirandomness must be defined. The motivation for considering sequences of groups stems from its connections with graphons, which are defined as limits of graphs in a certain sense.

Fix a real number $p \in [0, 1].$ A sequence of bipartite graphs $(G_n)$ (here $n$ is allowed to skip integers as long as $n$ tends to infinity) with $G_n$ having $n$ vertices, vertex parts $A_n$ and $B_n$, and $(p + o(1)) | A_n | | B_n |$ edges is quasirandom if any of the following equivalent conditions hold:

- For every bipartite graph $H$ with vertex parts $A'$ and $B'$, the number of labeled copies of $H$ in $G_n$ with $A'$ embedded in $A$ and $B'$ embedded in $B$ is $\left(p^{e(H)} + o(1)\right) | A | ^ {| A' |} | B | ^ {| B' |}.$ Here, the function $o(1)$ is allowed to depend on $H.$
- The number of closed, labeled walks of length 4 in $G_n$ starting in $A_n$ is $(p^4 + o(1))| A_n |^2 | B_n |^2.$
- The number of edges between $A'$ and $B'$ is $p | A' | | B' | + n^2 o(1)$ for any pair of subsets $A' \subseteq A_n$ and $B' \subseteq B_n.$
- $\sum\limits_{a_1, a_2 \in A_n} N(a_1, a_2)^2 = (p^4 + o(1)) | A_n |^2 | B_n |^2$, where $N(u, v)$ denotes the number of common neighbors of $u$ and $v.$
- $\sum\limits_{b_1, b_2 \in B_n} N(b_1, b_2)^2 = (p^4 + o(1)) | A_n |^2 | B_n |^2.$
- The largest eigenvalue of $G_n$'s adjacency matrix is $(p + o(1)) \sqrt{| A | | B |}$ and all other eigenvalues have magnitude at most $\sqrt{| A | | B |}o(1).$

It is a result of Chung–Graham–Wilson that each of the above conditions is equivalent. Such graphs are termed quasirandom because each condition asserts that the quantity being considered is approximately what one would expect if the bipartite graph was generated according to the Erdős–Rényi random graph model; that is, generated by including each possible edge between $A_n$ and $B_n$ independently with probability $p.$

Though quasirandomness can only be defined for sequences of graphs, a notion of $c$-quasirandomness can be defined for a specific graph by allowing an error tolerance in any of the above definitions of graph quasirandomness. To be specific, given any of the equivalent definitions of quasirandomness, the $o(1)$ term can be replaced by a small constant $c > 0$, and any graph satisfying that particular modified condition can be termed $c$-quasirandom. It turns out that $c$-quasirandomness under any condition is equivalent to $c^k$-quasirandomness under any other condition for some absolute constant $k \geq 1.$

The next step for defining group quasirandomness is the Cayley graph. Bipartite Cayley graphs give a way from translating quasirandomness in the graph-theoretic setting to the group-theoretic setting.

Given a finite group $\Gamma$ and a subset $S \subseteq \Gamma$, the bipartite Cayley graph $\operatorname{BiCay}(\Gamma, S)$ is the bipartite graph with vertex sets $A$ and $B$, each labeled by elements of $G$, whose edges $a \sim b$ are between vertices whose ratio $ab^{-1}$ is an element of $S.$

== Definition ==
With the tools defined above, one can now define group quasirandomness. A sequence of groups $(\Gamma_n)$ with $| \Gamma_n | = n$ (again, $n$ is allowed to skip integers) is quasirandom if for every real number $p \in [0, 1]$ and choice of subsets $S_n \subseteq \Gamma_n$ with $| S_n | = (p + o(1)) | \Gamma_n |$, the sequence of graphs $\operatorname{BiCay}(\Gamma_n, S_n)$ is quasirandom.

Though quasirandomness can only be defined for sequences of groups, the concept of $c$-quasirandomness for specific groups can be extended to groups using the definition of $c$-quasirandomness for specific graphs.

== Properties ==
As proved by Gowers, group quasirandomness turns out to be equivalent to a number of different conditions.

To be precise, given a sequence of groups $(\Gamma_n)$, the following are equivalent:

- $(\Gamma_n)$ is quasirandom; that is, all sequences of Cayley graphs defined by $(\Gamma_n)$ are quasirandom.
- The dimension of the smallest non-trivial representation of $\Gamma_n$ is unbounded.
- The size of the largest product-free subset of $\Gamma_n$ is $o(| \Gamma_n |).$
- The size of the smallest non-trivial quotient of $\Gamma_n$ is unbounded.

Cayley graphs generated from pseudorandom groups have strong mixing properties; that is, $\operatorname{BiCay}(\Gamma_n, S)$ is a bipartite $(n, d, \lambda)$-graph for some $\lambda$ tending to zero as $n$ tends to infinity. (Recall that an $(n, d, \lambda)$ graph is a graph with $n$ vertices, each with degree $d$, whose adjacency matrix has a second largest eigenvalue of at most $\lambda.$)

In fact, it can be shown that for any $c$-quasirandom group $\Gamma$, the number of solutions to $xy=z$ with $x \in X$, $y \in Y$, and $z \in Z$ is approximately equal to what one might expect if $S$ was chosen randomly; that is, approximately equal to $\tfrac{| X | | Y | | Z |}{| \Gamma |}.$ This result follows from a direct application of the expander mixing lemma.

== Examples ==
There are several notable families of quasirandom groups. In each case, the quasirandomness properties are most easily verified by checking the dimension of its smallest non-trivial representation.

- The projective special linear groups $\operatorname{PSL}(2, p)$ for prime $p$ form a sequence of quasirandom groups, since a classic result of Frobenius states that its smallest non-trivial representation has dimension at least $\tfrac{1}{2}(p-1).$ In fact, these groups are the groups with the largest minimal non-trivial representation, as a function of group order.
- The alternating groups $(A_n)$ are quasirandom, since its smallest non-trivial representation has dimension $n-1.$
- Any sequence of non-cyclic simple groups with increasing order is quasirandom, since its smallest non-trivial representation has dimension at least $\tfrac{1}{2}\sqrt{\log n}$, where $n$ is the order of the group. This can be improved using the Classification of the Finite Simple groups.
