= Steven R. Finch =

American mathematician (born 1959)

Steven R. Finch (born 1959) is an American mathematician and research computing specialist known for work in experimental mathematics, mathematical constants, geometric probability, and computational mathematics. He is the author of the well-regarded reference books, Mathematical Constants (2003) and Mathematical Constants II (2019), both published by Cambridge University Press.

== Early life, education, and career ==
Raised in Midland, Michigan, Finch was one of four children of Charles Richard Finch, a Dow Chemical engineer, and Shirley Peery Finch, a teacher. As a teenager, Finch studied musical composition and won several state and regional composition competitions. From 1977 to 1978, he attended the Interlochen Arts Academy to study composition, and several of his works were performed, including a May 1978 recital of eight of his compositions, for which he served as the pianist.

He received a B.A. in Mathematics from Oberlin College in 1982, where he was a member of Sigma Xi and Phi Beta Kappa, and an M.S. in Applied Mathematics from the University of Illinois Urbana-Champaign in 1985.

Early in his career, Finch worked at various times in statistical weather forecasting, technical editing, and biostatistics programming.

== Research career ==
Finch's research has included experimental mathematics, combinatorial number theory, geometric probability, and problems involving mathematical constants. His early work examined additive integer sequences, including patterns and periodicity in 1-additive sequences and related sum-free sets. He became interested in constants, and studied those arising in models of statistical mechanics, including self-avoiding walks, polyominoes, the Ising model, and percolation. Working with Irene Hueter on random convex hulls, Finch obtained an exact expression for a constant appearing in the asymptotic variance of the number of vertices of the convex hull of random points in a disk.

Finch is the author of two positively reviewed reference books, Mathematical Constants (2003) and Mathematical Constants II (2019), both published by Cambridge University Press. The first book received favorable reviews in a number of mathematical publications. Writing in The Mathematical Intelligencer, Jet Wimp concluded that "all mathematicians should own this book", while Gerry Leversha, in The Mathematical Gazette, described it as an "encyclopaedic feat of scholarship". Reviewing both volumes in 2020, Osmo Pekonen compared Finch's achievement to the On-Line Encyclopedia of Integer Sequences, describing the books as a collection of 269 "meticulously documented essays" and stating that Wimp's recommendation applied equally to Mathematical Constants II.

Finch received a Clay Mathematics Institute Book Fellowship beginning in 2004, and he and John Wetzel received the Lester R. Ford Award in 2005, given annually to "authors of articles of expository excellence" published in The American Mathematical Monthly, the journal of the Mathematical Association of America. The article for which the award was given surveyed a geometric minimization problem posed by Richard Bellman, seeking the shortest path to guarantee a hiker's escape from a known closed convex region regardless of the hiker's initial position and direction.

In addition to his work in mathematics, Finch has continued to compose and perform music as a classical pianist and choral singer. By 2003, he had released an album of his compositions, An Apple Gathering.

== Personal life ==
Finch is married to soprano Nancy Armstrong, with whom he also collaborated musically. Finch dedicated his 2003 book Mathematical Constants to Armstrong, writing, "For Nancy Armstrong, the one constant", and a 2015 profile of Armstrong described her as "married to a mathematician", with late 2010s obituaries for Armstrong's brother-in-law and Finch's father identifying the pair as a couple.
