= Sum-free set =

Set disjoint from its sumset with itself

In additive combinatorics and number theory, a subset A of an abelian group G is said to be sum-free if the sumset A + A is disjoint from A. In other words, A is sum-free if the equation $a + b = c$ has no solution with $a,b,c \in A$.

For example, the set of odd numbers is a sum-free subset of the integers, and the set {N + 1, ..., 2N} forms a large sum-free subset of the set {1, ..., 2N}. Fermat's Last Theorem is the statement that, for a given integer n > 2, the set of all nonzero n^{th} powers of the integers is a sum-free set.

Some basic questions that have been asked about sum-free sets are:

- How many sum-free subsets of {1, ..., N} are there, for an integer N? Ben Green has shown that the answer is $O(2^{N/2})$, as predicted by the Cameron–Erdős conjecture.
- How many sum-free sets does an abelian group G contain?
- What is the size of the largest sum-free set that an abelian group G contains?

A sum-free set is said to be maximal if it is not a proper subset of another sum-free set.

Let $f: [1, \infty) \to [1, \infty)$ be defined by $f(n)$ is the largest number $k$ such that any set of n nonzero integers has a sum-free subset of size k. The function is subadditive, and by the Fekete subadditivity lemma, $\lim_n\frac{f(n)}{n}$ exists.

Erdős proved that $\lim_n\frac{f(n)}{n} \geq \frac 13$, and conjectured that equality holds. This was proved in 2014 by Eberhard, Green, and Manners giving an upper bound matching Erdős' lower bound up to a function or order $o(n)$, $f(n) \leq \frac{n}{3}+o(n)$.

Erdős also asked if $f(n)\geq \frac{n}{3}+\omega(n)$ for some $\omega(n)\rightarrow \infty$, in 2025 Bedert in a preprint proved this giving the lower bound $f(n)\geq \frac{n}{3}+c\log\log n$.

== See also ==
- Erdős–Szemerédi theorem
- Sum-free sequence
