= Szidon =

Szidon is a surname. Notable people with the surname include:

- Roberto Szidon (1941–2011), Brazilian pianist
- Simon Szidon (1892–1941), Hungarian mathematician
