= Nilsequence =

In mathematics, a nilsequence is a type of numerical sequence playing a role in ergodic theory and additive combinatorics. The concept is related to nilpotent Lie groups and almost periodicity. The name arises from the part played in the theory by compact nilmanifolds of the type $G/ \Gamma$ where $G$ is a nilpotent Lie group and $\Gamma$ a lattice in it.

The idea of a basic nilsequence defined by an element $g$ of $G$ and continuous function $f$ on $G/ \Gamma$ is to take $b(n)$, for $n$ an integer, as $f(g^n \Gamma)$. General nilsequences are then uniform limits of basic nilsequences. For the statement of conjectures and theorems, technical side conditions and quantifications of complexity are introduced. Much of the combinatorial importance of nilsequences reflects their close connection with the Gowers norm. As explained by Host and Kra, nilsequences originate in evaluating functions on orbits in a "nilsystem"; and nilsystems are "characteristic for multiple correlations".

== Case of the circle group ==
The circle group arises as the special case of the real line and its subgroup of the integers. It has nilpotency class equal to 1, being abelian, and the requirements of the general theory are to generalise to nilpotency class $s > 1.$ The semi-open unit interval [0,1) is a fundamental domain, and for that reason the fractional part function is involved in the theory. Functions involving the fractional part $\{\{x\}\}$ of the variable in the circle group occur, under the name "bracket polynomials". Since the theory is in the setting of Lipschitz functions, which are a fortiori continuous, the discontinuity of the fractional part at 0 has to be managed.

That said, the sequences $\{\{\alpha n\}\}$, where $\alpha$ is a given irrational real number, and $n$ an integer, and studied in diophantine approximation, are simple examples for the theory. Their construction can be thought of in terms of the skew product construction in ergodic theory, adding one dimension.

== Polynomial sequences ==
The imaginary exponential function $e(x)$ maps the real numbers to the circle group (see Euler's formula#Topological interpretation). A numerical sequence $e(P(n))$ where $P$ is a polynomial function with real coefficients, and $n$ is an integer variable, is a type of trigonometric polynomial, called a "polynomial sequence" for the purposes of the nilsequence theory. The generalisation to nilpotent groups that are not abelian relies on the Hall–Petresco identity from group theory for a workable theory of polynomials. In particular the polynomial sequence comes with a definite degree.

== Möbius function and nilsequences ==
A family of conjectures $MN(s)$ was made by Ben Green and Terence Tao, concerning the Möbius function of prime number theory and $s$-step nilsequences. Here the underlying group $G$ is assumed simply connected and nilpotent with length at most $s$. The nilsequences considered are of type $f(g^n x\Gamma)$ with some fixed $x$ in $G$, and the function $f$ continuous and taking values in [-1,1]. The form of the conjecture, which requires a stated metric on the nilmanifold and Lipschitz bound in the implied constant, is that the average of $\mu (n) f(g^n x\Gamma)$ up to $N$ is smaller asymptotically than any fixed inverse power of $log N.$ As a subsequent paper published in 2012 proving the conjectures put it, The Möbius function is strongly orthogonal to nilsequences.

Subsequently Green, Tao and Tamar Ziegler also proved a family $IG(s)$ of inverse theorems for the Gowers norm, stated in terms of nilsequences. This completed a program of proving asymptotics for simultaneous prime values of linear forms.

Tao has commented in his book Higher Order Fourier Analysis on the role of nilsequences in the inverse theorem proof. The issue being to extend IG results from the finite field case to general finite cyclic groups, the "classical phases"—essentially the exponentials of polynomials natural for the circle group—had proved inadequate. There were options other than nilsequences, in particular direct use of bracket polynomials. But Tao writes that he prefers nilsequences for the underlying Lie theory structure.

=== Equivalent form for averaged Chowla and Sarnak conjectures ===
Tao has proved that a conjecture on nilsequences is an equivalent of an averaged form of a noted conjecture of Sarvadaman Chowla involving only the Möbius function, and the way it self-correlates. Peter Sarnak made a conjecture on the non-correlation of the Möbius function with more general sequences from ergodic theory, which is a consequence of Chowla's conjecture. Tao's result on averaged forms showed all three conjectures are equivalent. The 2018 paper The logarithmic Sarnak conjecture for ergodic weights by Frantzikinakis and Host used this approach to prove unconditional results on the Liouville function.
