= Arithmetic combinatorics =

Mathematical subject

In mathematics, arithmetic combinatorics is a field in the intersection of number theory, combinatorics, ergodic theory and harmonic analysis.

== Scope ==
Arithmetic combinatorics is about combinatorial estimates associated with arithmetic operations (addition, subtraction, multiplication, and division). Additive combinatorics is the special case when only the operations of addition and subtraction are involved.

Ben Green explains arithmetic combinatorics in his review of "Additive Combinatorics" by Tao and Vu.

== Important results ==
=== Szemerédi's theorem ===
Szemerédi's theorem is a result in arithmetic combinatorics concerning arithmetic progressions in subsets of the integers. In 1936, Erdős and Turán conjectured that every set of integers A with positive natural density contains a k term arithmetic progression for every k. This conjecture, which became Szemerédi's theorem, generalizes the statement of van der Waerden's theorem.

=== Green–Tao theorem and extensions ===
The Green–Tao theorem, proved by Ben Green and Terence Tao in 2004, states that the sequence of prime numbers contains arbitrarily long arithmetic progressions. In other words, there exist arithmetic progressions of primes, with k terms, where k can be any natural number. The proof is an extension of Szemerédi's theorem.

In 2006, Terence Tao and Tamar Ziegler extended the result to cover polynomial progressions. More precisely, given any integer-valued polynomials P_{1},..., P_{k} in one unknown m all with constant term 0, there are infinitely many integers x, m such that x + P_{1}(m), ..., x + P_{k}(m) are simultaneously prime. The special case when the polynomials are m, 2m, ..., km implies the previous result that there are length k arithmetic progressions of primes.

=== Breuillard–Green–Tao theorem ===
The Breuillard–Green–Tao theorem, proved by Emmanuel Breuillard, Ben Green, and Terence Tao in 2011, gives a complete classification of approximate groups. This result can be seen as a nonabelian version of Freiman's theorem, and a generalization of Gromov's theorem on groups of polynomial growth.

== Example ==
If A is a set of N integers, how large or small can the sumset

$$A+A := \{x+y: x,y \in A\},$$

the difference set

$$A-A := \{x-y: x,y \in A\},$$

and the product set

$$A\cdot A := \{xy: x,y \in A\}$$

be, and how are the sizes of these sets related? (Not to be confused: the terms difference set and product set can have other meanings.)

== Extensions ==
The sets being studied may be subsets of algebraic structures other than the integers, for example, groups, rings and fields.

== See also ==
- Additive number theory
- Additive combinatorics
- Approximate group
- Corners theorem
- Ergodic Ramsey theory
- Problems involving arithmetic progressions
- Schnirelmann density
- Shapley–Folkman lemma
- Sidon set
- Sum-free set
- Restricted sumset
- Sum-product phenomenon
