= József Solymosi =

Hungarian-Canadian mathematician

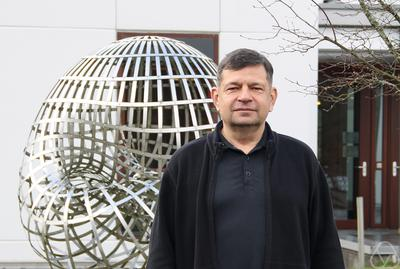
- Solymosi in Oberwolfach, 2024
- Education: ETH Zürich
- Scientific career
- Fields: Mathematics
- Workplaces: University of British Columbia
- Thesis: Ramsey-Type Results on Planar Geometric Objects (2001)
- Doctoral advisor: Emo Welzl

József Solymosi is a Hungarian-Canadian mathematician and a professor of mathematics at the University of British Columbia. His main research interests are arithmetic combinatorics, discrete geometry, graph theory, and combinatorial number theory.

== Education and career ==
Solymosi earned his master's degree in 1988 under the supervision of László Székely from the Eötvös Loránd University and his Ph.D. in 2001 at ETH Zürich under the supervision of Emo Welzl. His doctoral dissertation was Ramsey-Type Results on Planar Geometric Objects.

From 2001 to 2003 he was S. E. Warschawski Assistant Professor of Mathematics at the University of California, San Diego. He joined the faculty of the University of British Columbia in 2002.

He was editor in chief of the Electronic Journal of Combinatorics from 2013 to 2015.

== Contributions ==
Solymosi was the first online contributor to the first Polymath Project, set by Timothy Gowers to find improvements to the Hales–Jewett theorem.

One of his theorems states that if a finite set of points in the Euclidean plane has every pair of points at an integer distance from each other, then the set must have a diameter (largest distance) that is linear in the number of points. This result is connected to the Erdős–Anning theorem, according to which an infinite set of points with integer distances must lie on one line.^{[ID]} In connection with the related Erdős–Ulam problem, on the existence of dense subsets of the plane for which all distances are rational numbers, Solymosi and de Zeeuw proved that every infinite rational-distance set must either be dense in the Zariski topology or it must have all but finitely many of its points on a single line or circle.^{[EU]}

With Terence Tao, Solymosi proved a bound of $(mn)^{2/3+\varepsilon}$ on the number of incidences between $n$ points and $m$ affine subspaces of any finite-dimensional Euclidean space, whenever each pair of subspaces has at most one point of intersection. This generalizes the Szemerédi–Trotter theorem on points and lines in the Euclidean plane, and because of this the exponent of $2/3$ cannot be improved. Their theorem solves (up to the $\varepsilon$ in the exponent) a conjecture of Toth, and was inspired by an analogue of the Szemerédi–Trotter theorem for lines in the complex plane.^{[HD]}

He has also contributed improved bounds for the Erdős–Szemerédi theorem, showing that every set of real numbers has either a large set of pairwise sums or a large set of pairwise products,^{[ME]} and for the Erdős distinct distances problem, showing that every set of points in the plane has many different pairwise distances.^{[DD]}

== Recognition ==
In 2006, Solymosi received a Sloan Research Fellowship and in 2008 he was awarded the André Aisenstadt Mathematics Prize. In 2012 he was named a doctor of the Hungarian Academy of Science.

== Selected publications ==
DD.	Solymosi, J.; Tóth, Cs. D. (2001), "Distinct distances in the plane", Discrete & Computational Geometry, 25 (4): 629–634, doi:10.1007/s00454-001-0009-z, MR 1838423

ID.	Solymosi, József (2003), "Note on integral distances", Discrete & Computational Geometry, 30 (2): 337–342, doi:10.1007/s00454-003-0014-7, MR 2007970

ME.	Solymosi, József (2009), "Bounding multiplicative energy by the sumset", Advances in Mathematics, 222 (2): 402–408, arXiv:0806.1040, doi:10.1016/j.aim.2009.04.006, MR 2538014

EU.	Solymosi, Jozsef; de Zeeuw, Frank (2010), "On a question of Erdős and Ulam", Discrete & Computational Geometry, 43 (2): 393–401, arXiv:0806.3095, doi:10.1007/s00454-009-9179-x, MR 2579704

HD.	Solymosi, József; Tao, Terence (2012), "An incidence theorem in higher dimensions", Discrete & Computational Geometry, 48 (2): 255–280, arXiv:1103.2926, doi:10.1007/s00454-012-9420-x, MR 2946447, S2CID 17830766
