= Romanov's theorem =

Mathematical theorem

- Type: Theorem
- Field: Additive number theory
- Conjectured by: Alphonse de Polignac
- Conjectured in: 1849
- First proof by: Nikolai Pavlovich Romanov
- First proof in: 1934

In mathematics, specifically additive number theory, Romanov's theorem is a mathematical theorem proved by Nikolai Pavlovich Romanov. It states that given a fixed base b, the set of numbers that are the sum of a prime and a positive integer power of b has a positive lower asymptotic density.

== Statement ==
Romanov initially stated that he had proven the statements "In jedem Intervall (0, x) liegen mehr als ax Zahlen, welche als Summe von einer Primzahl und einer k-ten Potenz einer ganzen Zahl darstellbar sind, wo a eine gewisse positive, nur von k abhängige Konstante bedeutet" and "In jedem Intervall (0, x) liegen mehr als bx Zahlen, weiche als Summe von einer Primzahl und einer Potenz von a darstellbar sind. Hier ist a eine gegebene ganze Zahl und b eine positive Konstante, welche nur von a abhängt". These statements translate to "In every interval $(0,x)$ there are more than $\alpha x$ numbers which can be represented as the sum of a prime number and a k-th power of an integer, where $\alpha$ is a certain positive constant that is only dependent on k" and "In every interval $(0,x)$ there are more than $\beta x$ numbers which can be represented as the sum of a prime number and a power of a. Here a is a given integer and $\beta$ is a positive constant that only depends on a" respectively. The second statement is generally accepted as the Romanov's theorem, for example in Nathanson's book.

Precisely, let $d(x)=\frac{\left\vert \{n\le x:n=p+2^k,p\ \textrm{prime,}\ k\in\N\} \right\vert}{x}$ and let $\underline{d}=\liminf_{x\to\infty}d(x)$, $\overline{d}=\limsup_{x\to\infty}d(x)$. Then Romanov's theorem asserts that $\underline{d}>0$.

== History ==
Alphonse de Polignac wrote in 1849 that every odd number larger than 3 can be written as the sum of an odd prime and a power of 2. (He soon noticed a counterexample, namely 959.) This corresponds to the case of $a=2$ in the original statement. The counterexample of 959 was, in fact, also mentioned in Euler's letter to Christian Goldbach, but they were working in the opposite direction, trying to find odd numbers that cannot be expressed in the form.

In 1934, Romanov proved the theorem. The positive constant $\beta$ mentioned in the case $a=2$ was later known as Romanov's constant. Various estimates on the constant, as well as $\overline{d}$, has been made. The history of such refinements are listed below. In particular, since $\overline{d}$ is shown to be less than 0.5 this implies that the odd numbers that cannot be expressed this way has positive lower asymptotic density.

Refinements of $\overline{d}$ and $\underline{d}$
Year	Lower bound on $\underline{d}$	Upper bound on $\overline{d}$	Prover	Notes
1950		$0.5-5.06\times 10^{-80}$ (Note: Exact value is $0.5-\frac{1}{2^{241}\times 3\times 5\times 7\times 13\times 17\times 241}$.)	Paul Erdős	; First proof of infinitely many odd numbers that are not of the form $2^k+p$ through an explicit arithmetic progression
2004	0.0868		Chen, Xun	
2006	0.0933	0.49094093 (Note: The value cited is 0.4909409303984105956480078184, which is just approximate.)	Habsieger, Roblot	; Considers only odd numbers; not exact, see note
2006	0.093626		Pintz	; originally proved 0.9367, but an error was found and fixing it would yield 0.093626
2010	0.0936275		Habsieger, Sivak-Fischler	
2018	0.107648		Elsholtz, Schlage-Puchta	

== Generalisations ==
Analogous results of Romanov's theorem has been proven in number fields by Riegel in 1961. In 2015, the theorem was also proven for polynomials in finite fields. Also in 2015, an arithmetic progression of Gaussian integers that are not expressible as the sum of a Gaussian prime and a power of 1+i is given.
