= Tom Sanders (mathematician) =

British mathematician

- Education: University of Cambridge
- Known for: Arithmetic combinatorics
- Awards: European Prize in Combinatorics (2013); Whitehead Prize (2013); EMS Prize (2012); Adams Prize (2011); Royal Society University Research Fellowship
- Scientific career
- Fields: Mathematics
- Workplaces: University of Oxford
- Thesis: Topics in arithmetic combinatorics (2007)
- Doctoral advisor: Timothy Gowers
- Other academic advisors: Ben Green
- Website: people.maths.ox.ac.uk/sanders

Tom Sanders FRS is an English mathematician, working on problems in additive combinatorics at the interface of harmonic analysis and analytic number theory.

== Education ==
Sanders studied mathematics at the University of Cambridge, where he was awarded a PhD in 2007 for research on arithmetic combinatorics supervised by Timothy Gowers.

== Career and research ==
He held a Junior Research Fellowship at Christ's College, Cambridge from 2006 until 2011, in addition to visiting fellowships at the Institute for Advanced Study in 2007, the MSRI in 2008, and the Mittag-Leffler Institute in 2009. Since 2011, he has held a Royal Society University Research Fellowship (URF) at the University of Oxford, where he is also a senior research fellow at the Mathematical Institute, and a Tutorial Fellow at St Hugh's College, Oxford.

Among other results, he has improved the theorem of Klaus Friedrich Roth on three-term arithmetic progressions, coming close to breaking the so-called logarithmic barrier. More precisely, he has shown that any subset of {1, 2, ..., N} of maximal cardinality containing no non-trivial three-term arithmetic progression is of size $O\!\left(\frac{N (\log \log N)^5}{\log N}\right)\;\!\!\!.$

=== Awards and honours ===
In February 2011, he was awarded the Adams Prize (jointly with Harald Helfgott) for having "employed deep harmonic analysis to understand arithmetic progressions and answer long-standing conjectures in number theory". In July 2012, he was awarded a Prize of the European Mathematical Society for his "fundamental results in additive combinatorics and harmonic analysis, which combine in a masterful way deep known techniques with the invention of new methods to achieve spectacular results." In July 2013, he was awarded the Whitehead Prize of the London Mathematical Society for his "spectacular results in additive combinatorics and related areas", in particular "for his paper obtaining the best known upper bounds for sets of integers containing no 3-term arithmetic progressions, for his work dramatically improving bounds connected with Freiman's theorem on sets with small doubling, and for other results in additive combinatorics and harmonic analysis." In September 2013, he was awarded the European Prize in Combinatorics.
