= Tamar Ziegler =

Israeli mathematician

- תמר ציגלר
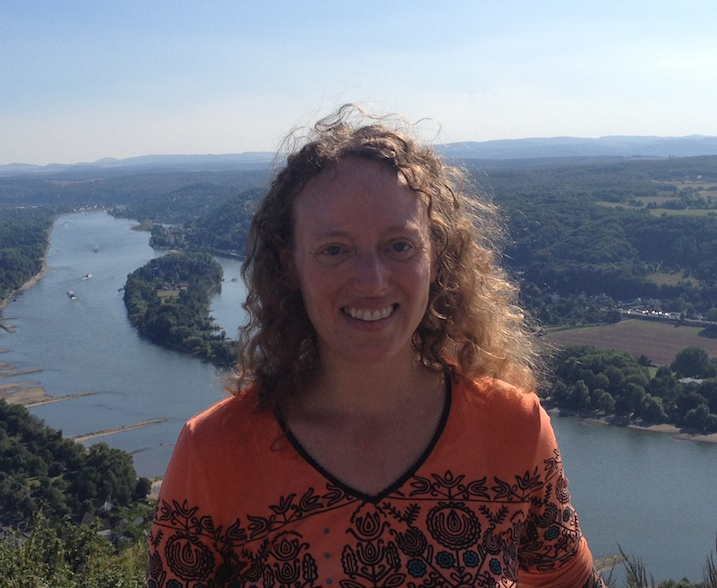
- Ziegler in 2013
- Citizenship: Israeli
- Education: The Hebrew University
- Awards: Erdős Prize (2011); Bruno Memorial Award (2015); Alexanderson Award(2023); Roshschild Prize (2024)
- Scientific career
- Fields: Ergodic theory, Combinatorics, Number theory
- Workplaces: Hebrew University; Technion
- Thesis: Nonconventional ergodic averages (2003)
- Doctoral advisor: Hillel Furstenberg
- Website: www.ma.huji.ac.il/~tamarz/

Tamar Debora Ziegler (Hebrew: תמר ציגלר; born 1971) is an Israeli mathematician specializing in Ergodic theory, Additive combinatorics and Number theory. She holds the Henry and Manya Noskwith Chair of Mathematics at the Einstein Institute of Mathematics at the Hebrew University. Ziegler is known for her contributions to the development of higher-order Fourier analysis and for applying methods from dynamical systems to problems in arithmetic combinatorics and number theory.

== Career ==
Ziegler received her Ph.D. in mathematics from the Hebrew University under the supervision of Hillel Furstenberg. Her thesis title was “Non conventional ergodic averages”. She spent five years in the US as a postdoc at the Ohio State University, the Institute for Advanced Study at Princeton, and the University of Michigan. She was a faculty member at the Technion during the years 2007–2013, and joined the Hebrew University in the Fall of 2013 as a full professor.

Ziegler served as an editor of several journals. Among others she was an editor of the Journal of the European Mathematical Society (JEMS), an associate editor of the Annals of Mathematics, and the Editor in Chief of the Israel Journal of Mathematics.

== Research ==
Ziegler's research lies in the interface of ergodic theory with several mathematical fields including combinatorics, number theory, algebraic geometry and theoretical computer science.

Together with Ben Green and Terence Tao, she developed the framework of higher-order Fourier analysis, which connects the Gowers norms with nilsequences, and is a powerful tool for analyzing arithmetic structures in sets of integers. These ideas led to major breakthroughs in understanding linear equations in primes.

Other important contributions include the generalization of the Green-Tao theorem to polynomial patterns, and the proof of the inverse conjecture for the Gowers norms in finite field geometry.

== Recognition ==
Ziegler won the Erdős Prize of the Israel Mathematical Union in 2011, the Bruno memorial award in 2015, the Alexanderson Award in 2023, and the Rothschild Prize in 2024. She received European Research Council Consolidator grant in 2016 and European Research Council Advanced grant in 2025.

Ziegler was the European Mathematical Society lecturer of the year in 2013, an invited sectional speaker at the 2014 International Congress of Mathematicians, an invited plenary speaker at the 2024 European Congress of Mathematics, and an invited plenary speaker at the 2026 International Congress of Mathematicians.

Ziegler was named MSRI Simons Professor for 2016–2017. She was a Distinguished Visiting Professor at the Institute for Advanced Study in 2022-23 leading the special year on Dynamics, Additive Number Theory and Algebraic Geometry]

Ziegler was elected to the Academia Europaea in 2021.

== Personal life ==
Ziegler is the daughter of Zvi Ziegler, a professor of mathematics at Technion – Israel Institute of Technology.
