= Plünnecke–Ruzsa inequality =

In additive combinatorics, the Plünnecke–Ruzsa inequality is an inequality that bounds the size of various sumsets of a set $B$, given that there is another set $A$ so that $A+B$ is not much larger than $A$. A slightly weaker version of this inequality was originally proven and published by Helmut Plünnecke (1970). Imre Ruzsa (1989) later published a simpler proof of the current, more general, version of the inequality. The inequality forms a crucial step in the proof of Freiman's theorem.

== Statement ==
The following sumset notation is standard in additive combinatorics. For subsets $A$ and $B$ of an abelian group and a natural number $k$, the following are defined:

- $A+B=\{a+b:a\in A,b\in B\}$
- $A-B=\{a-b:a\in A,b\in B\}$
- $kA=\underbrace{A+A+\cdots+A}_{k\text{ times}}$

The set $A + B$ is known as the sumset of $A$ and $B$.

=== Plünnecke-Ruzsa inequality ===
The most commonly cited version of the statement of the Plünnecke–Ruzsa inequality is the following.

Theorem (Plünnecke-Ruzsa inequality)—If $A$ and $B$ are finite subsets of an abelian group and $K$ is a constant so that $|A+B|\le K|A|$, then for all nonnegative integers $m$ and $n$,

$$|mB-nB|\le K^{m+n}|A|.$$

This is often used when $A = B$, in which case the constant $K = |2A|/|A|$ is known as the doubling constant of $A$. In this case, the Plünnecke–Ruzsa inequality states that sumsets formed from a set with small doubling constant must also be small.

=== Plünnecke's inequality ===
The version of this inequality that was originally proven by Plünnecke (1970) is slightly weaker.

Theorem (Plünnecke's inequality)—Suppose $A$ and $B$ are finite subsets of an abelian group and $K$ is a constant so that $|A+B|\le K|A|$. Then for all nonnegative integer $m$, $|mB|\le K^m|A|.$

== Proof ==
=== Ruzsa triangle inequality ===
The Ruzsa triangle inequality is an important tool which is used to generalize Plünnecke's inequality to the Plünnecke–Ruzsa inequality. Its statement is:

Theorem (Ruzsa triangle inequality)—If $A$, $B$, and $C$ are finite subsets of a group, then

$$|A||B-C|\le|A-B||A-C|.$$

=== Proof of Plünnecke-Ruzsa inequality ===
The following simple proof of the Plünnecke–Ruzsa inequality is due to Petridis (2014).

Lemma: Let $A$ and $B$ be finite subsets of an abelian group $G$. If $X\subseteq A$ is a nonempty subset that minimizes the value of $K'=|X+B|/|X|$, then for all finite subsets $C\subset G$,

$$|X+B+C|\le K'|X+C|.$$

Proof: This is demonstrated by induction on the size of $|C|$. For the base case of $|C|=1$, note that $S+C$ is simply a translation of $S$ for any $S\subseteq G$, so

$$|X+B+C|=|X+B|=K'|X|=K'|X+C|.$$

For the inductive step, assume the inequality holds for all $C\subseteq G$ with $|C|\le n$ for some positive integer $n$. Let $C$ be a subset of $G$ with $|C|=n+1$, and let $C=C'\sqcup\{\gamma\}$ for some $\gamma\in C$. (In particular, the inequality holds for $C'$.) Finally, let $Z=\{x\in X: x+B+\{\gamma\}\subseteq X+B+C'\}$. The definition of $Z$ implies that $Z+B+\{\gamma\}\subseteq X+B+C'$. Thus, by the definition of these sets,

$$X+B+C=(X+B+C')\cup((X+B+\{\gamma\})\backslash(Z+B+\{\gamma\})).$$

Hence, considering the sizes of the sets,

$$\begin{align}|X+B+C|&\le|X+B+C'|+|(X+B+\{\gamma\})\backslash(Z+B+\{\gamma\})|\\&=|X+B+C'|+|X+B+\{\gamma\}|-|Z+B+\{\gamma\}|\\&=|X+B+C'|+|X+B|-|Z+B|.\end{align}$$

The definition of $Z$ implies that $Z\subseteq X\subseteq A$, so by the definition of $X$, $|Z+B|\ge K'|Z|$. Thus, applying the inductive hypothesis on $C'$ and using the definition of $X$,

$$\begin{align}|X+B+C|&\le|X+B+C'|+|X+B|-|Z+B|\\&\le K'|X+C'|+|X+B|-|Z+B|\\&\le K'|X+C'|+K'|X|-|Z+B|\\&\le K'|X+C'|+K'|X|-K'|Z|\\&=K'(|X+C'|+|X|-|Z|).\end{align}$$

To bound the right side of this inequality, let $W=\{x\in X:x+\gamma\in X+C'\}$. Suppose $y\in X+C'$ and $y\in X+\{\gamma\}$, then there exists $x\in X$ such that $x+\gamma=y\in X+C'$. Thus, by definition, $x\in W$, so $y\in W+\{\gamma\}$. Hence, the sets $X+C'$ and $(X+\{\gamma\})\backslash(W+\{\gamma\})$ are disjoint. The definitions of $W$ and $C'$ thus imply that

$$X+C=(X+C')\sqcup((X+\{\gamma\})\backslash(W+\{\gamma\})).$$

Again by definition, $W\subseteq Z$, so $|W|\le|Z|$. Hence,

$$\begin{align}|X+C|&=|X+C'|+|(X+\{\gamma\})\backslash(W+\{\gamma\})|\\&=|X+C'|+|X+\{\gamma\}|-|W+\{\gamma\}|\\&=|X+C'|+|X|-|W|\\&\ge|X+C'|+|X|-|Z|.\end{align}$$

Putting the above two inequalities together gives

$$|X+B+C|\le K'(|X+C'|+|X|-|Z|)\le K'|X+C|.$$

This completes the proof of the lemma.

To prove the Plünnecke–Ruzsa inequality, take $X$ and $K'$ as in the statement of the lemma. It is first necessary to show that

$$|X+nB|\le K^n|X|.$$

This can be proved by induction. For the base case, the definitions of $K$ and $K'$ imply that $K'\le K$. Thus, the definition of $X$ implies that $|X+B|\le K|X|$. For inductive step, suppose this is true for $n=j$. Applying the lemma with $C=jB$ and the inductive hypothesis gives

$$|X+(j+1)B|\le K'|X+jB|\le K|X+jB|\le K^{j+1}|X|.$$

This completes the induction. Finally, the Ruzsa triangle inequality gives

$$|mB-nB|\le\frac{|X+mB||X+nB|}{|X|}\le\frac{K^m|X|K^n|X|}{|X|}=K^{m+n}|X|.$$

Because $X\subseteq A$, it must be the case that $|X|\le |A|$. Therefore,

$$|mB-nB|\le K^{m+n}|A|.$$

This completes the proof of the Plünnecke–Ruzsa inequality.

== Plünnecke graphs ==
Both Plünnecke's proof of Plünnecke's inequality and Ruzsa's original proof of the Plünnecke–Ruzsa inequality use the method of Plünnecke graphs. Plünnecke graphs are a way to capture the additive structure of the sets $A, A+B, A+2B, \dots$ in a graph theoretic manner

To define a Plünnecke graph we first define commutative graphs and layered graphs:

Definition. A directed graph $G$ is called semicommutative if, whenever there exist distinct $x, y, z_1, z_2, \dots, z_k$ such that $(x, y)$ and $(y, z_i)$ are edges in $G$ for each $i$, then there also exist distinct $y_1, y_2, \dots, y_k$ so that $(x, y_i)$ and $(y_i, z_i)$ are edges in $G$ for each $i$.

$G$ is called commutative if it is semicommutative and the graph formed by reversing all its edges is also semicommutative.

Definition. A layered graph is a (directed) graph $G$ whose vertex set can be partitioned $V_0 \cup V_1 \cup \dots \cup V_m$ so that all edges in $G$ are from $V_i$ to $V_{i+1}$, for some $i$.

Definition. A Plünnecke graph is a layered graph which is commutative.

The canonical example of a Plünnecke graph is the following, which shows how the structure of the sets $A, A+B, A+2B, \dots, A + mB$ form a Plünnecke graph.

Example. Let $A, B$ be subsets of an abelian group. Then, let $G$ be the layered graph so that each layer $V_j$ is a copy of $A + jB$, so that $V_0 = A$, $V_1 = A + B$, ..., $V_m = A + mB$. Create the edge $(x, y)$ (where $x \in V_i$ and $y \in V_{i+1}$) whenever there exists $b \in B$ such that $y = x + b$. (In particular, if $x \in V_i$, then $x + b \in V_{i+1}$ by definition, so every vertex has outdegree equal to the size of $B$.) Then $G$ is a Plünnecke graph. For example, to check that $G$ is semicommutative, if $(x, y)$ and $(y, z_i)$ are edges in $G$ for each $i$, then $y - x, z_i - y \in B$. Then, let $y_i = x + z_i - y$, so that $y_i - x = z_i - y \in B$ and $z_i - y_i = y - x \in B$. Thus, $G$ is semicommutative. It can be similarly checked that the graph formed by reversing all edges of $G$ is also semicommutative, so $G$ is a Plünnecke graph.

In a Plünnecke graph, the image of a set $X \subseteq V_0$ in $V_j$, written $\text{im}(X, V_j)$, is defined to be the set of vertices in $V_j$ which can be reached by a path starting from some vertex in $X$. In particular, in the aforementioned example, $\text{im}(X, V_j)$ is just $X + jB$.

The magnification ratio between $V_0$ and $V_j$, denoted $\mu_j(G)$, is then defined as the minimum factor by which the image of a set must exceed the size of the original set. Formally,

$$\mu_j(G) = \min_{X \subseteq V_0, X \neq \emptyset} \frac{|\text{im}(X, V_j)|}{|X|}.$$

Plünnecke's theorem is the following statement about Plünnecke graphs.

Theorem (Plünnecke's theorem)—Let $G$ be a Plünnecke graph. Then, $\mu_j(G)^{1/j}$ is decreasing in $j$.

The proof of Plünnecke's theorem involves a technique known as the "tensor product trick", in addition to an application of Menger's theorem.

The Plünnecke–Ruzsa inequality is a fairly direct consequence of Plünnecke's theorem and the Ruzsa triangle inequality. Applying Plünnecke's theorem to the graph given in the example, at $j = m$ and $j = 1$, yields that if $|A + B| / |A| = K$, then there exists $X \subseteq A$ so that $|X + mB| / |X| \le K^m$. Applying this result once again with $X$ instead of $A$, there exists $X' \subseteq X$ so that $|X' + nB| / |X'| \le K^n$. Then, by Ruzsa's triangle inequality (on $-X', mB, nB$),

$$|mB - nB| \le |X' + mB||X' + nB|/|X'| \le K^{m}|X| K^{n} = K^{m+n}|X|,$$

thus proving the Plünnecke–Ruzsa inequality.

== See also ==
- Additive combinatorics
- Freiman's theorem
- Ruzsa triangle inequality
