= Carmichael's totient function conjecture =

Problem in number theory on equal totients

In mathematics, Carmichael's totient function conjecture concerns the multiplicity of values of Euler's totient function $\varphi(n)$, which counts the number of integers less than and coprime to $n$. It states that, for every $n$ there is at least one other integer $m\ne n$ such that $\varphi(m)=\varphi(n)$. Robert Carmichael first stated this conjecture in 1907, but as a theorem rather than as a conjecture. However, his proof was faulty, and in 1922, he retracted his claim and stated the conjecture as an open problem.

== Examples ==
The totient function $\varphi(n)$ is equal to 2 when $n$ is one of the three values 3, 4, and 6. Thus, if we take any one of these three values as $n$, then either of the other two values can be used as the $m$ for which $\varphi(m)=\varphi(n)$.

Similarly, the totient is equal to 4 when $n$ is one of the four values 5, 8, 10, and 12, and it is equal to 6 when $n$ is one of the four values 7, 9, 14, and 18. In each case, there is more than one value of $n$ having the same value of $\varphi(n)$.

The conjecture states that this phenomenon of repeated values holds for every $n$.

$k$	values $n$ such that $\varphi(n)=k$ (sequence A032447 in the OEIS)	number of such values (sequence A014197 in the OEIS)
1	1, 2	2
2	3, 4, 6	3
4	5, 8, 10, 12	4
6	7, 9, 14, 18	4
8	15, 16, 20, 24, 30	5
10	11, 22	2
12	13, 21, 26, 28, 36, 42	6
16	17, 32, 34, 40, 48, 60	6
18	19, 27, 38, 54	4
20	25, 33, 44, 50, 66	5
22	23, 46	2
24	35, 39, 45, 52, 56, 70, 72, 78, 84, 90	10
28	29, 58	2
30	31, 62	2
32	51, 64, 68, 80, 96, 102, 120	7
36	37, 57, 63, 74, 76, 108, 114, 126	8
40	41, 55, 75, 82, 88, 100, 110, 132, 150	9
42	43, 49, 86, 98	4
44	69, 92, 138	3
46	47, 94	2
48	65, 104, 105, 112, 130, 140, 144, 156, 168, 180, 210	11
52	53, 106	2
54	81, 162	2
56	87, 116, 174	3
58	59, 118	2
60	61, 77, 93, 99, 122, 124, 154, 186, 198	9
64	85, 128, 136, 160, 170, 192, 204, 240	8
66	67, 134	2
70	71, 142	2
72	73, 91, 95, 111, 117, 135, 146, 148, 152, 182, 190, 216, 222, 228, 234, 252, 270	17

== Lower bounds ==
There are very high lower bounds for Carmichael's conjecture that are relatively easy to determine. Carmichael himself proved that any counterexample to his conjecture (that is, a value $n$ such that $\varphi(n)$ is different from the totients of all other numbers) must be at least 10^{37}, and Victor Klee extended this result to 10^{400}. A lower bound of $10^{10^7}$was given by Schlafly and Wagon, and a lower bound of $10^{10^{10}}$ was determined by Kevin Ford in 1998.

The computational technique underlying these lower bounds depends on some key results of Klee that make it possible to show that the smallest counterexample must be divisible by squares of the primes dividing its totient value. Klee's results imply that 8 and Fermat primes (primes of the form $2^{2^k}+1$) excluding 3 do not divide the smallest counterexample. Consequently, proving the conjecture is equivalent to proving that the conjecture holds for all integers congruent to 4 (mod 8).

== Other results ==
Ford also proved that if there exists a counterexample to the conjecture, then a positive proportion (in the sense of asymptotic density) of the integers are likewise counterexamples.

Although the conjecture is widely believed, Carl Pomerance gave a sufficient condition for an integer $n$ to be a counterexample to the conjecture (Pomerance 1974). According to this condition, $n$ is a counterexample if for every prime $p$ such that $p-1$ divides $\varphi(n)$, $p^2$ divides $n$. However Pomerance showed that the existence of such an integer is highly improbable. Essentially, one can show that if the first $k$ primes $p$ congruent to 1 (mod $q$) (where $q$ is a prime) are all less than $q^{k+1}$, then such an integer will be divisible by every prime and thus cannot exist. In any case, proving that Pomerance's counterexample does not exist is far from proving Carmichael's conjecture. However if it exists then infinitely many counterexamples exist as asserted by Ford.

Another way of stating Carmichael's conjecture is that, if $A(f)$ denotes the number of positive integers $n$ for which $\varphi(n)=f$, then $A(f)$ can never equal 1. Relatedly, Wacław Sierpiński conjectured that every positive integer other than 1 occurs as a value of $A(f)$, a conjecture that was proven in 1999 by Kevin Ford.
