= Erdős–Tenenbaum–Ford constant =

Mathematical constant

The Erdős–Tenenbaum–Ford constant is a mathematical constant that appears in number theory. Named after mathematicians Paul Erdős, Gérald Tenenbaum, and Kevin Ford, it is defined as

$$\delta := 1 - \frac{1 + \log \log 2}{\log 2} = 0.0860713320\dots$$

where $\log$ is the natural logarithm.

Following up on earlier work by Tenenbaum, Ford used this constant in analyzing the number $H(x,y,z)$ of integers that are at most $x$ and that have a divisor in the range $[y,z]$.

== Multiplication table problem ==
For each positive integer $N$, let $M(N)$ be the number of distinct integers in an $N \times N$ multiplication table. In 1960, Erdős studied the asymptotic behavior of $M(N)$ and proved that

$$M(N) = \frac{N^2}{(\log N)^{\delta + o(1)}},$$

as $N \to +\infty$.

Tenenbaum improved the Erdős multiplication table estimate, and Ford established an asymptotic best bound.
