= Approximate group =

Mathematical concept

In mathematics, an approximate group is a subset of a group which behaves like a subgroup "up to a constant error", in a precise quantitative sense (so the term approximate subgroup may be more correct). For example, it is required that the set of products of elements in the subset be not much bigger than the subset itself (while for a subgroup it is required that they be equal). The notion was introduced in the 2010s but can be traced to older sources in additive combinatorics.

== Formal definition ==
Let $G$ be a group and $K \ge 1$; for two subsets $X, Y \subset G$ we denote by $X\cdot Y$ the set of all products $xy, x\in X, y\in Y$. A non-empty subset $A \subset G$ is a $K$-approximate subgroup of $G$ if:

1. It is symmetric, that is if $g \in A$ then $g^{-1} \in A$;
2. There exists a subset $X \subset G$ of cardinality $|X| \le K$ such that $A \cdot A \subset X\cdot A$.

It is immediately verified that a finite 1-approximate subgroup is the same thing as a genuine subgroup. Of course this definition is only interesting when $K$ is small compared to $|A|$ (in particular, any subset $B \subset G$ is a $|B|$-approximate subgroup). In applications it is often used with $K$ being fixed and $|A|$ going to infinity.

Examples of approximate subgroups which are not groups are given by symmetric intervals and more generally arithmetic progressions in the integers. Indeed, for all $n \ge 1$ the subset $X = [-N, N] \subset \mathbb Z$ is a 2-approximate subgroup: the set $X + X = [-2N, 2N]$ is contained in the union of the two translates $X + N$ and $X - N$ of $X$. A generalised arithmetic progression in $\mathbb Z$ is a subset in $\mathbb Z$ of the form $\{n_1x_1 + \cdots + n_dx_d : |n_i| \le N_i\}$, and it is a $2^d$-approximate subgroup.

A more general example is given by balls in the word metric in finitely generated nilpotent groups.

== Classification of approximate subgroups ==
Approximate subgroups of the integer group $\mathbb Z$ were completely classified by Imre Z. Ruzsa and Freiman. The result is stated as follows:

For any $K \ge 1$ there are $C_K, c_K > 0$ such that for any $K$-approximate subgroup $A \subset \mathbb Z$ there exists a generalised arithmetic progression $P$ generated by at most $C_K$ integers and containing at least $c_K|A|$ elements, such that $A+A+A+A \supset P$.

The constants $C_K, C_K', c_K$ can be estimated sharply. In particular $A$ is contained in at most $C_K'$translates of $P$: this means that approximate subgroups of $\mathbb Z$ are "almost" generalised arithmetic progressions.

The work of Breuillard–Green–Tao (the culmination of an effort started a few years earlier by various other people) is a vast generalisation of this result. In a very general form its statement is the following:

Let $K \ge 1$; there exists $C_K$ such that the following holds. Let $G$ be a group and $A$ a $K$-approximate subgroup in $G$. There exists subgroups $H \triangleleft G_0 \le G$ with $H$ finite and $G_0/H$ nilpotent such that $A^4 \supset H$, the subgroup generated by $A^4$ contains $G_0$, and $A \subset X\cdot G_0$ with $|X| \le C_K$.

The statement also gives some information on the characteristics (rank and step) of the nilpotent group $G_0/H$.

In the case where $G$ is a finite matrix group the results can be made more precise, for instance:

Let $K \ge 1$. For any $d$ there is a constant $C_d$ such that for any finite field $\mathbb F_q$, any simple subgroup $G \subset \mathrm{GL}_d(\mathbb F_q)$ and any $K$-approximate subgroup $A \subset G$ then either $A$ is contained in a proper subgroup of $G$, or $|A| \le K^{C_d}$, or $|A| \ge |G|/K^{C_d}$.

The theorem applies for example to $\mathrm{SL}_d(\mathbb F_q)$; the point is that the constant does not depend on the cardinality $q$ of the field. In some sense this says that there are no interesting approximate subgroups (besides genuine subgroups) in finite simple linear groups (they are either "trivial", that is very small, or "not proper", that is almost equal to the whole group).

== Applications ==
The Breuillard–Green–Tao theorem on classification of approximate groups can be used to give a new proof of Gromov's theorem on groups of polynomial growth. The result obtained is actually a bit stronger since it establishes that there exists a "growth gap" between virtually nilpotent groups (of polynomial growth) and other groups; that is, there exists a (superpolynomial) function $f$ such that any group with growth function bounded by a multiple of $f$ is virtually nilpotent.

Other applications are to the construction of expander graphs from the Cayley graphs of finite simple groups, and to the related topic of superstrong approximation.
