= Kneser's theorem (combinatorics) =

One of several related theorems regarding the sizes of certain sumsets in abelian groups

In the branch of mathematics known as additive combinatorics, Kneser's theorem can refer to one of several related theorems regarding the sizes of certain sumsets in abelian groups. These are named after Martin Kneser, who published them in 1953 and 1956. They may be regarded as extensions of the Cauchy–Davenport theorem, which also concerns sumsets in groups but is restricted to groups whose order is a prime number.

The first three statements deal with sumsets whose size (in various senses) is strictly smaller than the sum of the size of the summands. The last statement deals with the case of equality for Haar measure in connected compact abelian groups.

== Strict inequality ==
If $G$ is an abelian group and $C$ is a subset of $G$, the group $H(C):= \{g\in G : g + C = C\}$ is the stabilizer of $C$.

=== Cardinality ===
Let $G$ be an abelian group. If $A$ and $B$ are nonempty finite subsets of $G$ satisfying $|A + B| < |A| + |B|$ and $H$ is the stabilizer of $A + B$, then
$$\begin{align} |A+B| &= |A+H| + |B+H| - |H|. \end{align}$$

This statement is a corollary of the statement for locally compact abelian groups below, obtained by specializing to the case where the ambient group is discrete. A self-contained proof is provided in Nathanson's textbook.

=== Lower asymptotic density in the natural numbers ===
The main result of Kneser's 1953 article is a variant of Mann's theorem on Schnirelmann density.

If $C$ is a subset of $\mathbb N$, the lower asymptotic density of $C$ is the number $\underline{d}(C) := \liminf_{n\to\infty} \frac{|C \cap \{1,\dots, n\}|}{n}$. Kneser's theorem for lower asymptotic density states that if $A$ and $B$ are subsets of $\mathbb N$ satisfying $\underline{d}(A+B) < \underline{d}(A) + \underline{d}(B)$, then there is a natural number $k$ such that $H:=k \mathbb N \cup \{0\}$ satisfies the following two conditions:

$(A+B+H)\setminus (A+B)$ is finite,

and

$$\underline{d}(A+B) = \underline{d}(A+H) + \underline{d}(B+H) - \underline{d}(H).$$

Note that $A+B \subseteq A+B+H$, since $0\in H$.

=== Haar measure in locally compact abelian (LCA) groups ===
Let $G$ be an LCA group with Haar measure $m$ and let $m_*$ denote the inner measure induced by $m$ (we also assume $G$ is Hausdorff, as usual). We are forced to consider inner Haar measure, as the sumset of two $m$-measurable sets can fail to be $m$-measurable. Satz 1 of Kneser's 1956 article can be stated as follows:

If $A$ and $B$ are nonempty $m$-measurable subsets of $G$ satisfying $m_*(A + B) < m(A) + m(B)$, then the stabilizer $H:=H(A+B)$ is compact and open. Thus $A+B$ is compact and open (and therefore $m$-measurable), being a union of finitely many cosets of $H$. Furthermore, $m(A+B) = m(A+H) + m(B+H) - m(H).$

== Equality in connected compact abelian groups ==
Because connected groups have no proper open subgroups, the preceding statement immediately implies that if $G$ is connected, then $m_*(A + B) \geq \min\{m(A) + m(B), m(G)\}$ for all $m$-measurable sets $A$ and $B$. Examples where

$m_*(A+B) = m(A) + m(B) < m(G)$	1

can be found when $G$ is the torus $\mathbb T:= \mathbb R/\mathbb Z$ and $A$ and $B$ are intervals. Satz 2 of Kneser's 1956 article says that all examples of sets satisfying equation (1) with non-null summands are obvious modifications of these. To be precise: if $G$ is a connected compact abelian group with Haar measure $m,$ $A$ and $B$ are $m$-measurable subsets of $G$ satisfying $m(A)>0, m(B)>0$, and equation (1), then there is a continuous surjective homomorphism $\phi: G \to \mathbb T$ and there are closed intervals $I$, $J$ in $\mathbb T$ such that $A \subseteq \phi^{-1}(I)$, $B \subseteq \phi^{-1}(J)$, $m(A) = m (\phi^{-1}(I))$, and $m(B) = m(\phi^{-1}(J))$.
