= Simon Sidon =

Hungarian mathematician

Simon Sidon or Simon Szidon (1892 in Versec, Kingdom of Hungary – 27 April 1941, Budapest, Hungary) was a reclusive Hungarian mathematician who worked on trigonometric series and orthogonal systems and who introduced Sidon sequences and Sidon sets.

== Death ==
On 27 April 1941, Sidon died from pneumonia in the hospital after a ladder fell on him and broke his leg.
