= Frobenius =

Frobenius is a latinized surname of German origin. Notable people with the surname include:

the Frobenius Family

- Georg Ludwig Frobenius (1566–1645), German publisher
- Johannes Frobenius (1460–1527), Swiss publisher and printer in Basel
- Hieronymus Frobenius (1501–1563), Swiss publisher and printer in Basel, son of Johannes
- Ambrosius Frobenius (1537–1602), Swiss publisher and printer in Basel, son of Hieronymus

Others

- August Sigmund Frobenius (died 1741), German chemist
- Ferdinand Georg Frobenius (1849–1917), German mathematician
  - List of things named after Ferdinand Georg Frobenius
- Leo Frobenius (1873–1938), German ethnographer
- Nikolaj Frobenius (born 1965), Norwegian writer and screenwriter

== See also ==
- Frobenius Orgelbyggeri, Danish organ building firm
