= Kevin Ford (mathematician) =

American mathematician (born 1967)

Kevin B. Ford
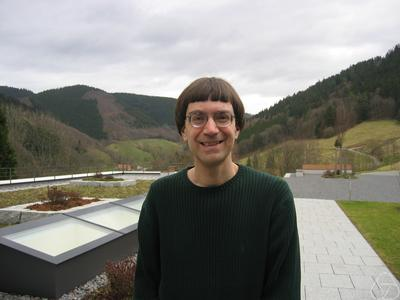
- Born: 22 December 1967 (age 58)
- Education: California State University, Chico; University of Illinois at Urbana-Champaign
- Known for: Carmichael's totient function conjecture; Sierpinski's conjecture; Work on prime gaps
- Scientific career
- Fields: Mathematics
- Workplaces: University of Illinois at Urbana-Champaign; University of South Carolina
- Doctoral advisor: Heini Halberstam

Kevin B. Ford (born 22 December 1967) is an American mathematician working in analytic number theory.

== Education and career ==
=== Early life ===
Ford received a Bachelor of Science in Computer Science and Mathematics in 1990 from the California State University, Chico. He then attended the University of Illinois at Urbana-Champaign (UIUC), where he completed his doctoral studies in 1994 under the supervision of Heini Halberstam. His dissertation was titled The representation of numbers as sums of unlike powers.

=== Early career (1994–2001) ===
From September 1994 to June 1995 he was at the Institute for Advanced Study. He was then a postdoc at UT Austin until 1998, while also doing software development at the NASA Ames Research Center during the summers of 1997 and 1998. From 1998 to 2001, Ford was an assistant professor at the University of South Carolina, Columbia.

=== Professorship (2001–present) ===
He has been a professor in the department of mathematics of UIUC since 2001. In addition, he returned to IAS from September 2009 to June 2010, was a research member at the Mathematical Sciences Research Institute in 2017, and was a visiting fellow at Magdalen College, Oxford in 2019.

As of 2025, Ford has supervised eight PhD students, all at UIUC.

== Research ==
Ford's early work focused on the distribution of Euler's totient function. In 1998, he published a paper that studied in detail the range of this function and established that Carmichael's totient function conjecture is true for all integers up to $10^{10^{10}}$. In 1999, he settled Sierpinski’s conjecture on Euler's totient function.

In August 2014, Kevin Ford, in collaboration with Green, Konyagin and Tao, resolved a longstanding conjecture of Erdős on large gaps between primes, also proven independently by James Maynard. The five mathematicians were awarded for their work the largest Erdős prize ($10,000) ever offered. In 2017, they improved their results in a joint paper.

He is one of the namesakes of the Erdős–Tenenbaum–Ford constant, named for his work using it in estimating the number of small integers that have divisors in a given interval.

== Recognition ==
In 2013, he became a fellow of the American Mathematical Society.
