= Mei-Chu Chang =

American mathematician

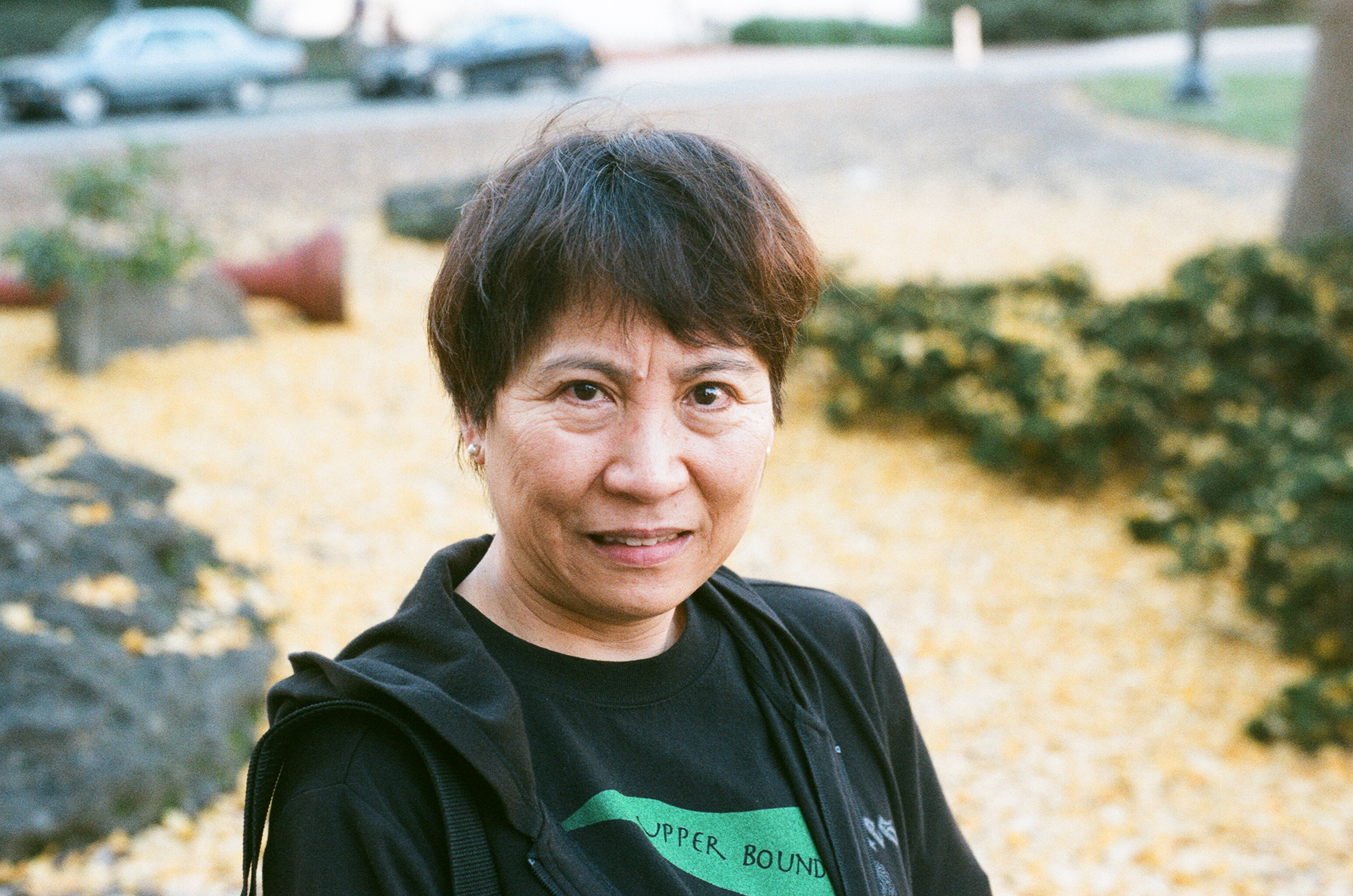
- Chang at Berkeley in 2010
- Education: National Taiwan University (BS); University of California, Berkeley (PhD)
- Scientific career
- Fields: Algebraic geometry, combinatorial number theory
- Thesis: Some Results on Stabel Rank 2 Vector Bundles and Reflexive Sheaves on P3
- Doctoral advisor: Robin Hartshorne

Mei-Chu Chang is a mathematician who works in algebraic geometry and combinatorial number theory.

== Education ==
Chang did her undergraduate studies in Taiwan and received a BS from National Taiwan University. She did her doctoral work at University of California, Berkeley, under the supervision of Robin Hartshorne and was awarded her PhD in 1982. Her dissertation was on Some Results on Stable Rank 2 Vector Bundles and Reflexive Sheaves on P^{3}.

== Career and research ==
After finishing her doctoral studies, Dr. Chang was appointed a Bateman Research Instructor at the California Institute of Technology. She held assistant professor positions at the University of Michigan and University of South Carolina before accepting a position as an associate professor at the University of California, Riverside in 1987. She was promoted to professor at Riverside in 1991. Prof. Chang has held visiting positions in Sweden, Korea, and Italy, at the IHES in Paris, and the IAS in Princeton, as well at several institutions in the US.

In her most cited work, A polynomial bound in Freiman's theorem, Professor Chang established new quantitative bounds for Freiman's inverse theorem.

== Honors ==
Mei-Chu Chang was elected a Fellow of the American Mathematical Society in 2017. The citation reads "For contributions to arithmetic combinatorics, analytic number theory, and algebraic geometry." In 2009 she was chosen to give a plenary address at the 9th International Conference on Finite Fields and Applications, which was held in Dublin, Ireland.
