= Sidon sequence =

Class of sequences of natural numbers

In number theory, a Sidon sequence is a sequence $A=\{a_0,a_1,a_2,\dots\}$ of natural numbers in which all pairwise sums $a_i+a_j$ (for $i\le j$) are different. Sidon sequences are also called Sidon sets; they are named after the Hungarian mathematician Simon Sidon, who introduced the concept in his investigations of Fourier series.

The main problem in the study of Sidon sequences, posed by Sidon, is to find the maximum number of elements that a Sidon sequence can contain, up to some bound $x$. Despite a large body of research, the question has remained unsolved.

== Early results ==
Paul Erdős and Pál Turán proved that, for every $x>0$, the number of elements smaller than $x$ in a Sidon sequence is at most $\sqrt{x}+O(\sqrt[4]{x})$. Several years earlier, James Singer had constructed Sidon sequences with $\sqrt{x}(1-o(1))$ terms less than x. The upper bound was improved to $\sqrt{x}+\sqrt[4]{x}+1$ in 1969 and to $\sqrt{x}+0.998\sqrt[4]{x}$ in 2023.

In 1994 Erdős offered 500 dollars for a proof or disproof of the bound $\sqrt{x}+o(x^\varepsilon)$.

== Dense Sidon Sets ==
A Sidon subset $A\subset [n] := \{1,2,\dots ,n\}$ is called dense if $\left | A\right | = \max \left | S\right |$ where the maximum is taken over all Sidon subsets of $[n]$. The structure of dense Sidon sets has a rich literature and classic constructions by Erdős–Turán, Singer, Bose, Spence, Hughes and Cilleruelo have established that a dense Sidon set $A$ satisfies $\left | A\right | \ge \left(1-o(1)\right)\sqrt{n}$. As remarked by Ruzsa, "somehow all known constructions of dense Sidon sets involve the primes".

A recent result of Balasubramanian and Dutta shows that if a dense Sidon set $A = \{a_1,\dots , a_{\left | A\right |}\}\subset [n]$ has cardinality $|A|=n^{1/2}-L^\prime$, then

$a_m = m\cdot n^{1/2} + \mathcal O\left( n^{7/8}\right) + \mathcal O\left(L^{1/2}\cdot n^{3/4}\right)$

where $L=\max\{0,L^\prime\}$. This directly gives some useful asymptotic results including

$\sum_{a\in A} a^\ell = \frac {1}{\ell +1} \cdot n^{\frac{2\ell +1}{2}} + \mathcal O \left( n^{\frac{8\ell +3}{8}} \right) + \mathcal O\left( L^{1/2}\cdot n^{\frac{4\ell +1}{4}}\right)$

for any positive integer $\ell$.

Dense Sidon sets often exhibit surprising symmetries. For example, it is known that dense Sidon sets are uniformly distributed, equidistributed in residue classes, and even in smooth Bohr neighbourhoods.

== Infinite Sidon sequences ==
Erdős also showed that, for any particular infinite Sidon sequence $A$ with $A(x)$ denoting the number of its elements up to $x$,
$$\liminf_{x \to \infty} \frac{A(x)\sqrt{\log x}}{\sqrt{x}}\leq 1.$$
That is, infinite Sidon sequences are thinner than the densest finite Sidon sequences.

For the other direction, Chowla and Mian observed that the greedy algorithm gives an infinite Sidon sequence with $A(x)>c\sqrt[3]{x}$ for every $x$. Ajtai, Komlós, and Szemerédi improved this with a construction of a Sidon sequence with
$$A(x)>\sqrt[3]{x\log x}.$$

The best lower bound to date was given by Imre Z. Ruzsa, who proved that a Sidon sequence with
$$A(x)>x^{\sqrt{2}-1-o(1)}$$
exists. Erdős conjectured that an infinite Sidon set $A$ exists for which $A(x)>x^{1/2-o(1)}$ holds. He and Rényi showed the existence of a sequence $\{a_0,a_1,\dots\}$ with the conjectural density but satisfying only the weaker property that there is a constant $k$ such that for every natural number $n$ there are at most $k$ solutions of the equation $a_i+a_j=n$. (To be a Sidon sequence would require that $k=1$.)

Erdős further conjectured that there exists a nonconstant integer-coefficient polynomial whose values at the natural numbers form a Sidon sequence. Specifically, he asked if the set of fifth powers is a Sidon set. Ruzsa came close to this by showing that there is a real number $c$ with $0<c<1$ such that the range of the function $f(x)=x^5+\lfloor cx^4\rfloor$ is a Sidon sequence, where $\lfloor\ \rfloor$ denotes the integer part. As $c$ is irrational, this function $f(x)$ is not a polynomial. The statement that the set of fifth powers is a Sidon set is a special case of the later conjecture of Lander, Parkin and Selfridge.

== Sidon sequences which are asymptotic bases ==
The existence of Sidon sequences that form an asymptotic basis of order $m$ (meaning that every sufficiently large natural number $n$ can be written as the sum of $m$ numbers from the sequence) has been proved for $m=5$ in 2010, $m=4$ in 2014, $m=3+\varepsilon$ (the sum of four terms with one smaller than $n^\varepsilon$, for arbitrarily small positive $\varepsilon$) in 2015 and $m=3$ in 2024. This last one was posed as a problem in a paper of Erdős, Sárközy and Sós in 1994.

== Relationship to Golomb rulers ==
All finite Sidon sets are Golomb rulers, and vice versa.

To see this, suppose for a contradiction that $S$ is a Sidon set and not a Golomb ruler. Since it is not a Golomb ruler, there must be four members such that $a_i-a_j=a_k-a_l$. It follows that $a_i+a_l=a_k+a_j$, which contradicts the proposition that $S$ is a Sidon set. Therefore all Sidon sets must be Golomb rulers. By a similar argument, all Golomb rulers must be Sidon sets.

== See also ==
- Moser–de Bruijn sequence
- Sumset
