= Expander mixing lemma =

The expander mixing lemma intuitively states that the edges of certain $d$-regular graphs are evenly distributed throughout the graph. In particular, the number of edges between two vertex subsets $S$ and $T$ is always close to the expected number of edges between them in a random $d$-regular graph, namely $\frac dn|S||T|$.

== d-Regular Expander Graphs ==
Define an $(n, d, \lambda)$-graph to be a $d$-regular graph $G$ on $n$ vertices such that all of the eigenvalues of its adjacency matrix $A_G$ except one have absolute value at most $\lambda.$ The $d$-regularity of the graph guarantees that its largest absolute value of an eigenvalue is $d.$ In fact, the all-1's vector $\mathbf1$ is an eigenvector of $A_G$ with eigenvalue $d$, and the eigenvalues of the adjacency matrix will never exceed the maximum degree of $G$ in absolute value.

If we fix $d$ and $\lambda$ then $(n, d, \lambda)$-graphs form a family of expander graphs with a constant spectral gap.

== Statement ==
Let $G = (V, E)$ be an $(n, d, \lambda)$-graph. For any two subsets $S, T \subseteq V$, let $e(S, T) = |\{(x,y) \in S \times T : xy \in E(G)\}|$ be the number of edges between S and T (counting edges contained in the intersection of S and T twice). Then

$$\left|e(S, T) - \frac{d |S| |T|}{n}\right| \leq \lambda  \sqrt{|S| |T| }\,.$$

=== Tighter Bound ===
We can in fact show that

$$\left|e(S, T) - \frac{d |S| |T|}{n}\right| \leq \lambda  \sqrt{|S| |T| (1 - |S|/n)(1 - |T|/n)}\,$$

using similar techniques.

=== Biregular Graphs ===
For biregular graphs, we have the following variation, where we take $\lambda$ to be the second largest eigenvalue.

Let $G = (L, R, E)$ be a bipartite graph such that every vertex in $L$ is adjacent to $d_L$ vertices of $R$ and every vertex in $R$ is adjacent to $d_R$ vertices of $L$. Let $S \subseteq L, T \subseteq R$ with $|S| = \alpha|L|$ and $|T| = \beta |R|$. Let $e(G) = |E(G)|$. Then

$$\left|\frac{e(S, T)}{e(G)} - \alpha \beta\right| \leq \frac{\lambda}{\sqrt{d_Ld_R}}  \sqrt{\alpha \beta (1 - \alpha) (1 - \beta)} \leq \frac{\lambda}{\sqrt{d_Ld_R}} \sqrt{\alpha \beta}\,.$$

Note that $\sqrt{d_L d_R}$ is the largest eigenvalue of $G$.

== Proofs ==
=== Proof of First Statement ===
Let $A_G$ be the adjacency matrix of $G$ and let $\lambda_1\geq\cdots\geq\lambda_n$ be the eigenvalues of $A_G$ (these eigenvalues are real because $A_G$ is symmetric). We know that $\lambda_1=d$ with corresponding eigenvector $v_1=\frac 1{\sqrt n}\mathbf{1}$, the normalization of the all-1's vector. Define $\lambda=\sqrt{\max\{\lambda_2^2,\dots,\lambda_n^2\}}$ and note that $\max\{\lambda_2^2,\dots,\lambda_n^2\}=\lambda^2\leq\lambda_1^2=d^2$. Because $A_G$ is symmetric, we can pick eigenvectors $v_2,\ldots,v_n$ of $A_G$ corresponding to eigenvalues $\lambda_2,\ldots,\lambda_n$ so that $\{v_1,\ldots,v_n\}$ forms an orthonormal basis of $\mathbf R^n$.

Let $J$ be the $n\times n$ matrix of all 1's. Note that $v_1$ is an eigenvector of $J$ with eigenvalue $n$ and each other $v_i$, being perpendicular to $v_1=\mathbf{1}$, is an eigenvector of $J$ with eigenvalue 0. For a vertex subset $U \subseteq V$, let $1_U$ be the column vector with $v^\text{th}$ coordinate equal to 1 if $v\in U$ and 0 otherwise. Then,

$$\left|e(S,T)-\frac dn|S||T|\right|=\left|1_S^\operatorname{T}\left(A_G-\frac dnJ\right)1_T\right|$$.

Let $M=A_G-\frac dnJ$. Because $A_G$ and $J$ share eigenvectors, the eigenvalues of $M$ are $0,\lambda_2,\ldots,\lambda_n$. By the Cauchy-Schwarz inequality, we have that $|1_S^\operatorname{T}M1_T|=\langle 1_S, M1_T\rangle\leq\|1_S\|\|M1_T\|$. Furthermore, because $M$ is self-adjoint, we can write

$$\|M1_T\|^2=\langle M1_T,M1_T\rangle=\langle 1_T,M^21_T\rangle=\left\langle 1_T,\sum_{i=1}^nM^2\langle 1_T,v_i\rangle v_i\right\rangle=\sum_{i=2}^n\lambda_i^2\langle 1_T,v_i\rangle^2\leq\lambda^2\|1_T\|^2$$.

This implies that $\|M1_T\|\leq\lambda\|1_T\|$ and $\left|e(S,T)-\frac dn|S||T|\right|\leq\lambda\|1_S\|\|1_T\|=\lambda\sqrt{|S||T|}$.

=== Proof Sketch of Tighter Bound ===
To show the tighter bound above, we instead consider the vectors $1_S-\frac{|S|}n\mathbf 1$ and $1_T-\frac{|T|}n\mathbf 1$, which are both perpendicular to $v_1$. We can expand

$$1_S^\operatorname{T}A_G1_T=\left(\frac{|S|}n\mathbf 1\right)^\operatorname{T}A_G\left(\frac{|T|}n\mathbf 1\right)+\left(1_S-\frac{|S|}n\mathbf 1\right)^\operatorname{T}A_G\left(1_T-\frac{|T|}n\mathbf 1\right)$$

because the other two terms of the expansion are zero. The first term is equal to $\frac{|S||T|}{n^2}\mathbf 1^\operatorname{T}A_G\mathbf 1=\frac dn|S||T|$, so we find that

$$\left|e(S,T)-\frac dn|S||T|\right|
\leq\left|\left(1_S-\frac{|S|}n\mathbf 1\right)^\operatorname{T}A_G\left(1_T-\frac{|T|}n\mathbf 1\right)\right|$$

We can bound the right hand side by $\lambda\left\|1_S-\frac{|S|}{|n|}\mathbf 1\right\|\left\|1_T-\frac{|T|}{|n|}\mathbf 1\right\| =\lambda\sqrt{|S||T|\left(1-\frac{|S|}n\right)\left(1-\frac{|T|}n\right)}$ using the same methods as in the earlier proof.

== Applications ==
The expander mixing lemma can be used to upper bound the size of an independent set within a graph. In particular, the size of an independent set in an $(n, d, \lambda)$-graph is at most $\lambda n/d.$ This is proved by letting $T=S$ in the statement above and using the fact that $e(S,S)=0.$

An additional consequence is that, if $G$ is an $(n, d, \lambda)$-graph, then its chromatic number $\chi(G)$ is at least $d/\lambda.$ This is because, in a valid graph coloring, the set of vertices of a given color is an independent set. By the above fact, each independent set has size at most $\lambda n/d,$ so at least $d/\lambda$ such sets are needed to cover all of the vertices.

A second application of the expander mixing lemma is to provide an upper bound on the maximum possible size of an independent set within a polarity graph. Given a finite projective plane $\pi$ with a polarity $\perp,$ the polarity graph is a graph where the vertices are the points a of $\pi$, and vertices $x$ and $y$ are connected if and only if $x\in y^{\perp}.$ In particular, if $\pi$ has order $q,$ then the expander mixing lemma can show that an independent set in the polarity graph can have size at most $q^{3/2} - q + 2q^{1/2} - 1,$ a bound proved by Hobart and Williford.

== Converse ==
Bilu and Linial showed that a converse holds as well: if a $d$-regular graph $G = (V, E)$ satisfies that for any two subsets $S, T \subseteq V$ with $S \cap T = \empty$ we have

$$\left|e(S, T) - \frac{d |S| |T|}{n}\right| \leq \lambda \sqrt{|S| |T|},$$

then its second-largest (in absolute value) eigenvalue is bounded by $O(\lambda (1+\log(d/\lambda)))$.

== Generalization to hypergraphs ==
Friedman and Widgerson proved the following generalization of the mixing lemma to hypergraphs.

Let $H$ be a $k$-uniform hypergraph, i.e. a hypergraph in which every "edge" is a tuple of $k$ vertices. For any choice of subsets $V_1, ..., V_k$ of vertices,

$$\left| |e(V_1,...,V_k)| - \frac{k!|E(H)|}{n^k}|V_1|...|V_k| \right| \le \lambda_2(H)\sqrt{|V_1|...|V_k|}.$$
