= Imre Z. Ruzsa =

Hungarian mathematician

- Born: 23 July 1953 (age 73); Budapest
- Education: Eötvös Loránd University
- Scientific career
- Fields: Mathematics

Imre Z. Ruzsa (born 23 July 1953) is a Hungarian mathematician specializing in number theory.

== Life ==
He graduated from the Eötvös Loránd University in 1976. Since then he has been at the Alfréd Rényi Institute of Mathematics of the Hungarian Academy of Sciences. He was awarded the Rollo Davidson Prize in 1988. He was elected corresponding member (1998) and member (2004) of the Hungarian Academy of Sciences. He was invited speaker at the European Congress of Mathematics at Stockholm, 2004, and in the Combinatorics section of the International Congress of Mathematicians in Madrid, 2006. In 2012 he became a fellow of the American Mathematical Society.

== Work ==
With Endre Szemerédi he proved subquadratic upper and lower bounds for the Ruzsa–Szemerédi problem on the number of triples of points in which the union of any three triples contains at least seven points. He proved that an essential component has at least (log x)^{1+ε} elements up to x, for some ε > 0. On the other hand, for every ε > 0 there is an essential component that has at most (log x)^{1+ε} elements up to x, for every x. He gave a new proof to Freiman's theorem. Ruzsa also showed the existence of a Sidon sequence which has at least x^{0.41} elements up to x.

In a result complementing the Erdős–Fuchs theorem he showed that there exists a sequence a_{0}, a_{1}, ... of natural numbers such that for every n the number of solutions of the inequality a_{i} + a_{j} ≤ n is cn + O(n^{1/4}log n) for some c > 0.

== Selected publications ==
- Ruzsa, I. Z.; Szemerédi, E. (1978). "Triple systems with no six points carrying three triangles". Colloq. Math. Soc. János Bolyai. 18. North-Holland, Amsterdam-New York: 939–945.
- Ruzsa, I. Z. (1987). "Essential components". Proceedings of the London Mathematical Society. 54: 38–56. doi:10.1112/plms/s3-54.1.38.
- Ruzsa, I. Z. (1994). "Generalized arithmetical progressions and sumsets". Acta Mathematica Hungarica. 65 (4): 379–388. doi:10.1007/BF01876039. S2CID 121469006.
- Ruzsa, Imre Z. (1997). "The Brunn-Minkowski inequality and nonconvex sets". Geometriae Dedicata. 67 (3): 337–348. doi:10.1023/A:1004958110076. MR 1475877. S2CID 117749981.

== See also ==
- Ruzsa triangle inequality
- Plünnecke–Ruzsa inequality
