= Additive number theory =

Study of subsets of integers and behavior under addition

Additive number theory is the subfield of number theory concerning the study of subsets of integers and their behavior under addition. More abstractly, the field of additive number theory includes the study of abelian groups and commutative semigroups with an operation of addition. Additive number theory has close ties to combinatorial number theory and the geometry of numbers. Principal objects of study include the sumset of two subsets A and B of elements from an abelian group G,

$$A + B = \{a+b : a \in A, b \in B\},$$

and the h-fold sumset of A,

$$hA = \underset{h}{\underbrace{A + \cdots + A}}\,.$$

== Additive number theory ==
The field is principally devoted to consideration of direct problems over (typically) the integers, that is, determining the structure of hA from the structure of A: for example, determining which elements can be represented as a sum from hA, where A is a fixed subset. Two classical problems of this type are the Goldbach conjecture (which is the conjecture that 2ℙ contains all even numbers greater than two, where ℙ is the set of primes) and Waring's problem (which asks how large must h be to guarantee that hA_{k} contains all positive integers, where

$$A_k=\{0^k,1^k,2^k,3^k,\ldots\}$$

is the set of kth powers). Many of these problems are studied using the tools from the Hardy-Littlewood circle method and from sieve methods. For example, Vinogradov proved that every sufficiently large odd number is the sum of three primes, and so every sufficiently large even integer is the sum of four primes. Hilbert proved that, for every integer k > 1, every non-negative integer is the sum of a bounded number of kth powers. In general, a set A of nonnegative integers is called a basis of order h if hA contains all positive integers, and it is called an asymptotic basis if hA contains all sufficiently large integers. Much current research in this area concerns properties of general asymptotic bases of finite order. For example, a set A is called a minimal asymptotic basis of order h if A is an asymptotic basis of order h but no proper subset of A is an asymptotic basis of order h. It has been proved that minimal asymptotic bases of order h exist for all h, and that there also exist asymptotic bases of order h that contain no minimal asymptotic bases of order h. Another question to be considered is how small can the number of representations of n as a sum of h elements in an asymptotic basis can be. This is the content of the Erdős–Turán conjecture on additive bases.

== See also ==
- Shapley–Folkman lemma
- Additive combinatorics
- Multiplicative combinatorics
- Multiplicative number theory
