= List of things named after Paul Erdős =

The following are named after Paul Erdős:

== Theorems ==
- de Bruijn–Erdős theorem (graph theory)
- de Bruijn–Erdős theorem (incidence geometry)
- Davenport–Erdős theorem
- Erdős–Anning theorem
- Erdős–Beck theorem
- Erdős–Dushnik–Miller theorem
- Erdős–Fuchs theorem
- Erdős–Gallai theorem
- Erdős–Ginzburg–Ziv theorem
- Erdős–Kac theorem
- Erdős–Kaplansky theorem
- Erdős–Ko–Rado theorem
- Erdős–Nagy theorem
- Erdős–Pósa theorem
- Erdős–Rado theorem
- Erdős-Sós theorem
- Erdős–Stone theorem
- Erdős–Szekeres theorem
- Erdős–Szemerédi theorem
- Erdős–Tetali theorem
- Erdős–Wintner theorem
- Erdős–Mordell inequality
- Chung–Erdős inequality
- Erdős–Turán inequality
- Hsu–Robbins–Erdős theorem
- Erdős arcsine law

== Conjectures ==
- Erdős conjecture — a list of numerous conjectures named after Erdős; See also List of conjectures by Paul Erdős.
  - Erdős conjecture on arithmetic progressions
  - Erdős discrepancy problem
  - Erdős distinct distances problem
  - Burr–Erdős conjecture
  - Cameron–Erdős conjecture
  - Erdős–Faber–Lovász conjecture
  - Erdős–Graham conjecture — see Erdős–Graham problem
  - Erdős–Hajnal conjecture
  - Erdős–Gyárfás conjecture
  - Erdős–Straus conjecture
  - Erdős sumset conjecture
  - Erdős–Szekeres conjecture
  - Erdős–Turán conjecture (disambiguation)
  - Erdős–Turán conjecture on additive bases
  - Erdős–Ulam problem
  - Erdős–Moser equation

== Definitions ==
- Erdős cardinal
- Erdős–Nicolas number
- Erdős–Diophantine graph
- Erdős–Rényi model
- Erdős space
- Erdős–Woods number

=== Constants ===
- Copeland–Erdős constant
- Erdős–Tenenbaum–Ford constant

== Other ==
- Erdős number
  - Erdős–Bacon number
- Erdős Prize
- Erdős Lectures
- Paul Erdős Award of the World Federation of National Mathematics Competitions
- Paul Erdős Prize
- Heterothele erdosi, a species of tarantula from Nigeria.

== See also ==
- List of conjectures by Paul Erdős
