= Erdos (disambiguation) =

Paul Erdős (1913–1996) was one of the most prolific 20th-century mathematicians.

Erdos or Erdős may also refer to:

- Erdős (surname), Hungarian surname.
- Erdos Group, a Chinese conglomerate
- Lesnica (Slovakia) (Hungarian: Erdős), a village and municipality in Slovakia
- Ordos City, a city in Inner Mongolia, China

== See also ==
- List of things named after Paul Erdős
