= List of conjectures by Paul Erdős =

The prolific mathematician Paul Erdős and his various collaborators made many mathematical conjectures across subjects, and in many cases Erdős offered monetary rewards for solving them.

The unsolved problems are commonly known as Erdős problems.

== Unsolved ==
- The Erdős–Gyárfás conjecture on cycles with lengths equal to a power of two in graphs with minimum degree 3.
- The Erdős–Hajnal conjecture that in a family of graphs defined by an excluded induced subgraph, every graph has either a large clique or a large independent set.
- The Erdős–Mollin–Walsh conjecture on consecutive triples of powerful numbers.
- The Erdős–Selfridge conjecture that a covering system with distinct moduli contains at least one even modulus.
- The Erdős–Straus conjecture on the Diophantine equation 4/n = 1/x + 1/y + 1/z.
- The Erdős conjecture on arithmetic progressions in sequences with divergent sums of reciprocals.
- The Erdős–Szekeres conjecture on the number of points needed to ensure that a point set contains a large convex polygon.
- The Erdős–Turán conjecture on additive bases of natural numbers.
- A conjecture on quickly growing integer sequences with rational reciprocal series.
- A conjecture with Norman Oler on circle packing in an equilateral triangle with a number of circles one less than a triangular number.
- The minimum overlap problem to estimate the limit of M(n).
- A conjecture that the ternary expansion of $2^n$ contains at least one digit 2 for every $n > 8$.
- The conjecture that the Erdős–Moser equation, 1^{k} + 2^{k} + ⋯ + (m − 1)^{k} = m^{k}, has no solutions except 1^{1} + 2^{1} = 3^{1}.

== Solved ==
=== Proved ===
- The Erdős–Faber–Lovász conjecture on coloring unions of cliques, proved (for all large n) by Dong Yeap Kang, Tom Kelly, Daniela Kühn, Abhishek Methuku, and Deryk Osthus in 2021.
- The Erdős sumset conjecture on sets, proven by Joel Moreira, Florian Karl Richter and Donald Robertson in 2018. The proof appeared in the Annals of Mathematics journal in March 2019.
- The Burr–Erdős conjecture on Ramsey numbers of graphs, proved by Choongbum Lee in 2015.
- A conjecture on equitable colorings proven in 1970 by András Hajnal and Endre Szemerédi and now known as the Hajnal–Szemerédi theorem.
- The Erdős–Lovász conjecture on weak/strong delta-systems, proved by Michel Deza in 1974.
- The Erdős–Heilbronn conjecture in combinatorial number theory on the number of sums of two sets of residues modulo a prime, proved by Dias da Silva and Hamidoune in 1994.
- The Erdős–Graham conjecture in combinatorial number theory on monochromatic Egyptian fraction representations of unity, proved by Ernie Croot in 2000.
- The Erdős–Stewart conjecture on the Diophantine equation n! + 1 = p_{k}^{a} p_{k+1}^{b}, solved by Florian Luca in 2001.
- The Cameron–Erdős conjecture on sum-free sets of integers, proved by Ben Green and Alexander Sapozhenko in 2003–2004.
- The Erdős–Menger conjecture on disjoint paths in infinite graphs, proved by Ron Aharoni and Eli Berger in 2009.
- The Erdős distinct distances problem. The correct exponent was proved in 2010 by Larry Guth and Nets Katz, but the correct power of log n is still undetermined.
- The Erdős–Rankin conjecture on prime gaps, proved by Ford, Green, Konyagin, and Tao in 2014.
- The Erdős discrepancy problem on partial sums of ±1-sequences. Terence Tao announced a solution in September 2015; it was published in 2016.
- The Erdős squarefree conjecture that central binomial coefficients C(2n, n) are never squarefree for n > 4 was proved in 1996 by Olivier Ramaré and Andrew Granville.
- The Erdős primitive set conjecture that the sum $\sum_{n\in A}\frac{1}{n\log n}$ for any primitive set A (a set where no member of the set divides another member) attains its maximum at the set of prime numbers, proved by Jared Duker Lichtman in 2022.
- The Erdős–Sauer problem about the maximum number of edges an n-vertex graph can have without containing a k-regular subgraph, was solved by Oliver Janzer and Benny Sudakov.
- Terence Tao reported that Erdős problem 728 was solved in 2026 using AI assistance. The proof was constructed in the Lean proof language by Kevin Barreto and Liam Price with the assistance of ChatGPT 5.2 and the Aristotle Lean API.
- Erdős problem 347 on the subset sums of sequences with ratio limit 2 was proved in January 2026 by Enrique Barschkis; the proof was formally verified in the Lean proof assistant.
- In March 2026, Erdős problem 369 was solved by 17-year-old Sky Yang (Yueer Yang), and the result was later proven correct after verification in Lean.
- Erdős problem 90, the planar unit distance problem, was solved by an internal OpenAI model in May 2026.
- Erdős problem 522 on random Littlewood polynomials was solved by Sebastien Kawada in 2026. The proof was verified in Lean and accepted into Google DeepMind's Formal Conjectures project. Wolfram MathWorld documents the result.

=== Disproved ===
- A conjecture that would have strengthened the Furstenberg–Sárközy theorem to state that the number of elements in a square-difference-free set of positive integers could only exceed the square root of its largest value by a polylogarithmic factor, disproved by András Sárközy in 1978.

== See also ==
- List of things named after Paul Erdős
- List of mathematical discoveries by artificial intelligence
- List of unsolved problems in mathematics
