= Egon Orowan =

Hungarian-British physicist (1902–1989)

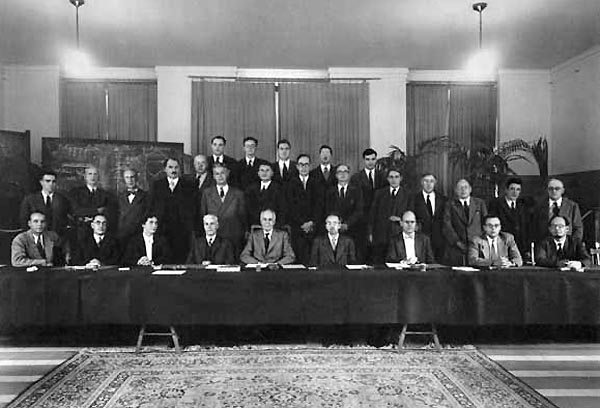
Solvay Conference on Physics in Brussels 1951. Left to right, sitting: Crussaro, N.P. Allen, Cauchois, Borelius, Bragg, Moller, Sietz, Hollomon, Frank; middle row: Rathenau,^{(nl)} Koster, Rudberg,^{(sv)}, Flamache, Goche, Groven, Orowan, Burgers, Shockley, Guinier, C.S. Smith, Dehlinger, Laval, Henriot; top row: Gaspart, Lomer, Cottrell, Homes, Curien

Egon Orowan FRS (Hungarian: Orován Egon) (2 August 1902 – 3 August 1989) was a Hungarian-British physicist and metallurgist. He was key in introducing crystal dislocation into physics and understanding of how materials plastically deform under stress. According to György Marx, he was one of The Martians, a group of Jews born in Pest between 1890 and 1910 who shaped the 20th century's technology after moving to the West.

== Early life ==
Orowan was born in the Óbuda district of Budapest in 1902. His parents were Josze (Josephine) Spitzer Ságvári and Berthold Orowan, a mechanical engineer and factory manager.

He attended the Staatsobergymnasium (Main Gimnázium) in District 9 of Budapest, graduating from high school in June 1920. In 1920 he went to the University of Vienna, where he studied chemistry, mathematics, astronomy, and physics for two years. After six months of mandatory apprenticeship done home in Hungary, he was admitted to the Technische Hochschule in Charlottenburg (now Technische Universität Berlin), where he studied mechanical and then electrical engineering. Eventually he started his experiments in physics, where he became the assistant of Professor Richard Becker in 1928. He completed his master's in 1928 and his doctorate of engineering in 1933 on the fracture of mica.

Soon after Hitler's rise to power in 1933, Orowan, who was of Jewish descent, left his studies and career in Berlin and returned to Hungary.

== Career ==
In 1934, Orowan wrote his famous paper on dislocations. He had been doing the experiments, while still in Berlin, which supported the theory put forward in Becker's 1925 paper. In 1934, Orowan, roughly contemporarily with G. I. Taylor and Michael Polanyi, realized that the plastic deformation of ductile materials could be explained in terms of the theory of dislocations developed by Vito Volterra in 1905. Though the discovery was neglected until after World War II, it was critical in developing the modern science of solid mechanics.

In Hungary, he seemed to have experienced some difficulty in finding immediate employment and spent the next few years living with his mother and ruminating on his doctoral research. From 1936 to 1939, he worked for the Tungsram light bulbs manufacturer, where, with the help of Mihály (Michael) Polanyi, he developed a new process for the extraction of krypton from the air.

In 1937, aware of the imminence of war, Orowan accepted the invitation of Rudolf Peierls and moved to the University of Birmingham in the United Kingdom where they worked together on the theory of fatigue. In 1939, he moved to the Cavendish Laboritory at University of Cambridge, where William Lawrence Bragg inspired his interest in x-ray diffraction. He worked on structural problems on merchant marine ships.

During World War II, he worked on problems of munitions production, particularly that of plastic flow during rolling. In 1944, he was central to the reappraisal of the causes of the loss of many Liberty ships during the war, identifying the critical issues of the notch sensitivity of poor quality welds and the aggravating effects of the extremely low temperatures of the North Atlantic.

In June 1950, he became a professor at the Massachusetts Institute of Technology where he headed its materials division and conducted research on solid-state materials. He became the George Westinghouse professor of mechanical engineering at MIT. Later, his research interests expanded to include geology. He was a visiting professor at the Carnegie Institute of Technology in 1962, the Boeing Scientific Research Laboratory for a year in 1965–1977, and at the University of Pittsburgh in 1972.

Orowan retired in 1968. After his retirement, he researched and wrote about economic stability in Western society, coming up with the term "socionomy". He also studied the Arab historian Ibn-Khaldun.

== Honors ==
- Fellow of the Royal Society (1947)
- Member of the American Academy of Arts and Sciences (1951)
- Bingham Medal of the Society of Rheology (1959)
- Honorary doctor of engineering degree from Technische Universität Berlin (1965)
- Gauss Medal of the Braunschweiger Wissenschaftliche Gesellschaft (1968)
- Member of the National Academy of Sciences (1969)
- Vincent Bendix Gold Medal of the American Society for Engineering Education (1971)
- Corresponding member of the Göttingen Academy of Sciences (1972)
- Paul Bergse Medal of the Danish Metallurgical Society (1973)
- The Acta Metallurgica Gold Medal (1985)

== Personal life ==
On 20 January 1941, Orowan married Joan Schonfeld, a pianist who studied at the Budapest Academy of Music. They met in Budapest but were not romantically involved until meeting again in England where she was a refugee from Germany. They had one daughter, Susan K. (née Orowan) Martin.

Orowan died at the age of 87 on 3 August 1989, in the Mount Auburn Hospital in Cambridge, Massachusetts. He was buried in the Mount Auburn Cemetery.

== Selected publications ==
- "Zur Temperaturabhängigkeit der Kristallplastizität". Zeitschrift für Physikysik, vol. 102 (1936) 112–118.
- "The Rate of Plastic Flow as a Function of Temperature". Proceedings of the Royal Society, vol. A168 (1938): 307–310.
- "Problems of Plastic Gliding". Proceedings of the Physical Society, vol. 52 (1940): 8-22.
- "Origin and Spacing of Slip Bands". Nature, vol. 147 (1941): 452–454.
- "A New Method in X-ray Crystallography". Nature, vol. 149 (1942): 355–356.
- "The Fatigue of Glass Under Stress". Nature, vol. 154 (1944): 341–343.
- "Fracture and Notch Brittleness in Ductile Materials", in Brittle Fracture in Mild Steel Plates, British Iron and Steel Research Association Part 5 (1945) 69–78.
- "Creep in Metallic and Non-metallic Materials". Proceeding of the First. U.S. National Congress of Applied Mechanics. New York: ASME, 1953. pp. 453– 472.
- "Condition of High Velocity Ductile Fracture". Journal of Applied Physics, vol. 26 (1955): 900–902.
- "Continental Drift and the Origin of Mountains". Science, vol. 146 (1964): 1003–1010.
- "Dilatancy and the Seismic Focal Mechanism". Reviews of Geophysics, vol. 4 (1966): 395–404.
- "The Origin of the Oceanic Ridges". Scientific American, vol. 221 (1969): 102–119.
- "Surface Energy and Surface Tension in Solids and Liquids". Proceeding of the Royal Society, vol. A316 (1970) 473–491.

== See also ==
- The Martians (scientists)
