= Hungarian mathematics =

History and development of mathematics in Hungary

Hungary has produced a disproportionately large number of influential mathematicians, a phenomenon called Hungarian mathematics.

== History ==
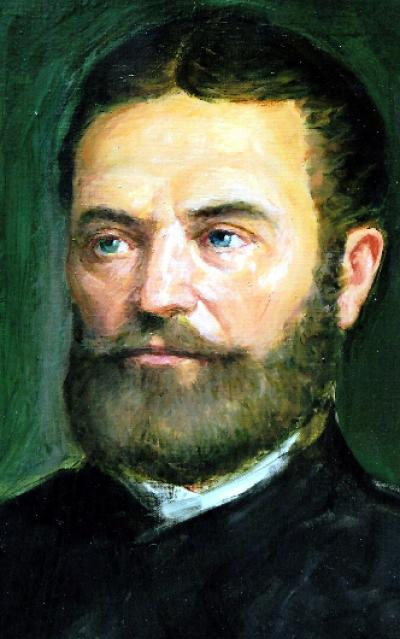
János Bolyai, one of the first Hungarian mathematicians to rise to prominence.

János Bolyai and his father Farkas Bolyai are credited with initiating the Hungarian mathematics phenomenon in the early 1800s. Though they were largely ignored during their lifetimes, János Bolyai's work on hyperbolic geometry would later be recognized as foundational to modern mathematics. Farkas Bolyai had studied at Göttingen from 1796 to 1799, where he formed a lasting friendship with Carl Friedrich Gauss. When Farkas sent his son's discoveries to Gauss, he wrote back with "I cannot praise this work too highly, for to do so would be to praise myself": Gauss had apparently anticipated the discovery but never published his findings. The Hungarian Academy of Sciences later established the Bolyai Prize in János's honor in 1905, though it was only awarded twice (to Henri Poincaré and David Hilbert) before being discontinued due to World War I. The Bolyai Prize was re-established in 2000.

Hungary began to be known as a mathematical powerhouse in the early 20th century, through a combination of social, educational and institutional developments. The Austro-Hungarian Compromise of 1867, which granted Hungary autonomy within the Habsburg Empire, and the emancipation of Hungarian Jews, permitted Jews to work for the state and teach in its schools.

The Hungarian monthly publication Középiskolai Matematikai és Fizikai Lapok (KöMaL), founded by Arany Dániel, created a culture of mathematical problem-solving and helped identify promising gifted young talent. The Eötvös Competition, named after the physicist Baron Loránd Eötvös, was also recognized for its ability to identify mathematical talent; a number of its winners went on to become world-renowned mathematicians, including John von Neumann, Paul Erdős, and Peter Lax.

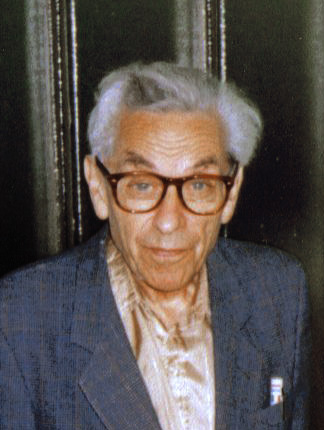
Hungarian mathematician Paul Erdős

In the early 20th century, Lipót Fejér created what is considered the first coherent mathematical school in Hungary. Frigyes Riesz established the University of Szeged through the Bolyai Institute. His book on functional analysis, co-authored with Béla Szőkefalvi-Nagy, became a classic in the field. Riesz was known for his elegant approach to mathematics, achieving far-reaching results using elementary methods. Mathematical elegance would become associated with the Hungarian style of mathematics.

Dénes Kőnig wrote the first book on graph theory in 1936. Paul Erdős, one of the most prolific mathematicians of all time, would become the field's most influential figure.

== Hungarian phenomenon ==
The Hungarian phenomenon refers to Hungary's ability to disproportionately produce leading mathematicians compared to its small population. During the Interwar period, Hungary—a small, relatively poor country of fewer than 10 million people—produced renowned mathematicians such as John von Neumann, Paul Erdős, George Pólya, and Theodore von Kármán.

== See also ==
- Japanese mathematics
- History of the Jews in Hungary
- List of Hungarian mathematicians
- List of topics named after Paul Erdős
- The Martians (scientists), a joke of Leo Szilard
