= Erdős–Fuchs theorem =

Theorem in additive number theory

In mathematics, in the area of additive number theory, the Erdős–Fuchs theorem is a statement about the number of ways that numbers can be represented as a sum of elements of a given additive basis, stating that the average order of this number cannot be too close to being a linear function.

The theorem is named after Paul Erdős and Wolfgang Heinrich Johannes Fuchs, who published it in 1956.

== Statement ==
Let $\mathcal{A}\subseteq\mathbb{N}$ be an infinite subset of the natural numbers and $r_{\mathcal{A},h}(n)$ its representation function, which denotes the number of ways that a natural number $n$ can be expressed as the sum of $h$ elements of $\mathcal{A}$ (taking order into account). We then consider the accumulated representation function
$$s_{\mathcal{A},h}(x) := \sum_{n\leqslant x} r_{\mathcal{A},h}(n),$$
which counts (also taking order into account) the number of solutions to $k_1 + \cdots + k_h \leqslant x$, where $k_1,\ldots,k_h \in \mathcal{A}$. The theorem then states that, for any given $c>0$, the relation
$$s_{\mathcal{A},2}(n) = cn + o\left(n^{1/4}\log(n)^{-1/2} \right)$$
cannot be satisfied; that is, there is no $\mathcal{A}\subseteq\mathbb{N}$ satisfying the above estimate.

== Theorems of Erdős–Fuchs type ==
The Erdős–Fuchs theorem has an interesting history of precedents and generalizations. In 1915, it was already known by G. H. Hardy that in the case of the sequence $\mathcal{Q}:=\{0,1,4,9,\ldots\}$ of perfect squares one has
$$\limsup_{n\to +\infty} \frac{\left|s_{\mathcal{Q},2}(n)- \pi n\right|}{n^{1/4}\log(n)^{1/4}} > 0$$
This estimate is a little better than that described by Erdős–Fuchs, but at the cost of a slight loss of precision, P. Erdős and W. H. J. Fuchs achieved complete generality in their result (at least for the case $h=2$). Another reason this result is so celebrated may be due to the fact that, in 1941, P. Erdős and P. Turán conjectured that, subject to the same hypotheses as in the theorem stated, the relation
$$s_{\mathcal{A},2}(n) = cn + O(1)$$
could not hold. This fact remained unproven until 1956, when Erdős and Fuchs obtained their theorem, which is even stronger than the previously conjectured estimate.

=== Improved versions for h = 2 ===
This theorem has been extended in a number of different directions. In 1980, A. Sárközy considered two sequences which are "near" in some sense. He proved the following:

- Theorem (Sárközy, 1980). If $\mathcal{A} = \{a_1 < a_2 <\ldots\}$ and $\mathcal{B} = \{b_1 < b_2 < \ldots\}$ are two infinite subsets of natural numbers with $a_i - b_i = o\big(a_i ^{1/2}\log(a_i)^{-1} \big)$, then $|\{(i,j):a_i+b_j \leqslant n\}| = cn + o\big(n^{1/4}\log(n)^{-1/2} \big)$ cannot hold for any constant $c > 0$.

In 1990, H. L. Montgomery and R. C. Vaughan were able to remove the log from the right-hand side of Erdős–Fuchs original statement, showing that
$$s_{\mathcal{A},2}(n) = cn + o(n^{1/4})$$
cannot hold. In 2004, Gábor Horváth extended both these results, proving the following:

- Theorem (Horváth, 2004). If $\mathcal{A}=\{a_1<a_2<\ldots\}$ and $\mathcal{B}=\{b_1<b_2<\ldots\}$ are infinite subsets of natural numbers with $a_i-b_i = o\big(a_i^{1/2}\big)$ and $|\mathcal{A}\cap[0,n]| - |\mathcal{B}\cap[0,n]| = O(1)$, then $|\{(i,j):a_i+b_j \leqslant n\}| = cn + o\big(n^{1/4} \big)$ cannot hold for any constant $c>0$.

=== General case (h ≥ 2) ===
The natural generalization to Erdős–Fuchs theorem, namely for $h \geqslant 3$, is known to hold with same strength as the Montgomery–Vaughan's version. In fact, M. Tang showed in 2009 that, in the same conditions as in the original statement of Erdős–Fuchs, for every $h \geqslant 2$ the relation
$$s_{\mathcal{A},h}(n) = cn + o(n^{1/4})$$
cannot hold. In another direction, in 2002, Gábor Horváth gave a precise generalization of Sárközy's 1980 result, showing that

- Theorem (Horváth, 2002) If $\mathcal{A}^{(j)}=\{a^{(j)}_1<a^{(j)}_2<\ldots\}$ ($j=1,\ldots,k$) are $k$ (at least two) infinite subsets of natural numbers and the following estimates are valid:
1. $a^{(1)}_i - a^{(2)}_i = o\big((a^{(1)}_i) ^{1/2}\log(a_i^{(1)})^{-k/2} \big)$
2. $|\mathcal{A}^{(j)}\cap[0,n]| = \Theta\big(|\mathcal{A}^{(1)}\cap[0,n]|\big)$ (for $j=3,\ldots,k$)

then the relation:
$|\{(i_1,\ldots, i_k):a^{(1)}_{i_1}+\ldots+a^{(k)}_{i_k} \leqslant n,~ a^{(j)}_{i_j} \in \mathcal{A}^{(j)} (j =1,\ldots,k)\}| = cn + o\big(n^{1/4}\log(n)^{1-3k/4} \big)$
cannot hold for any constant $c >0$.

=== Non-linear approximations ===
Yet another direction in which the Erdős–Fuchs theorem can be improved is by considering approximations to $s_{\mathcal{A},h}(n)$ other than $cn$ for some $c>0$. In 1963, Paul T. Bateman, Eugene E. Kohlbecker and Jack P. Tull proved a slightly stronger version of the following:

- Theorem (Bateman–Kohlbecker–Tull, 1963). Let $L(x)$ be a slowly varying function which is either convex or concave from some point onward. Then, on the same conditions as in the original Erdős–Fuchs theorem, we cannot have $s_{\mathcal{A},2}(n) = nL(n) + o\big(n^{1/4}\log(n)^{-1/2}L(n)^\alpha \big)$, where $\alpha = 3/4$ if $L(x)$ is bounded, and $1/4$ otherwise.

At the end of their paper, it is also remarked that it is possible to extend their method to obtain results considering $n^{\gamma}$ with $\gamma \neq 1$, but such results are deemed as not sufficiently definitive.

== See also ==
- Erdős–Tetali theorem: For any $h \geq 2$, there is a set $\mathcal{A}\subseteq \mathbb{N}$ which satisfies $r_{\mathcal{A},h}(n) = \Theta(\log(n))$. (Existence of economical bases)
- Erdős–Turán conjecture on additive bases: If $\mathcal{A}\subseteq\mathbb{N}$ is an additive basis of order 2, then $r_{\mathcal{A},2}(n) \neq O(1)$. (Bases cannot be too economical)
