= The Martians (scientists) =

Group of prominent Hungarian scientists

"The Martians" (Hungarian: "A marslakók") were a group of prominent scientists (mostly, but not exclusively, physicists and mathematicians) of Hungarian Jewish descent who emigrated from Europe to the United States in the early half of the 20th century.

Leo Szilard jokingly suggested that Hungary was a front for aliens from Mars. In an answer to the question of why there is no evidence of intelligent life beyond Earth (called the Fermi paradox) despite its high probability of existence, Szilárd responded: "They are already here among us – they just call themselves Hungarians." This account is featured in György Marx's book The Voice of the Martians.

== Men included in the description ==
Individuals considered members of The Martians group include:

- Cornelius Lanczos
- Edward Teller
- Egon Orowan
- Eugene Wigner
- Franz Alexander
- George de Hevesy
- George Olah
- George Pólya
- John G. Kemeny
- John Harsanyi
- John Polanyi
- John von Neumann
- Leó Szilárd
- Paul Erdős
- Paul Halmos
- Paul Neményi
- Peter Carl Goldmark
- Peter Lax
- Theodore von Kármán
- Valentine Telegdi

== Origin of the name ==
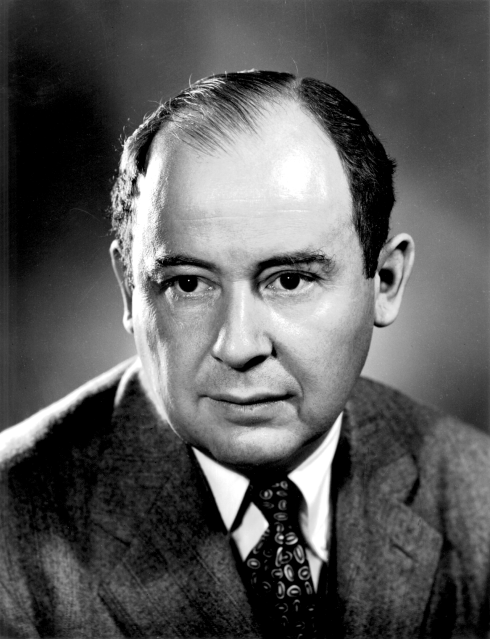
John von Neumann at Los Alamos

The original story from György Marx's book The Voice of the Martians:

The universe is vast, containing myriads of stars ... likely to have planets circling around them. ... The simplest living things will multiply, evolve by natural selection and become more complicated till eventually active, thinking creatures will emerge. ... Yearning for fresh worlds ... they should spread out all over the Galaxy. These highly exceptional and talented people could hardly overlook such a beautiful place as our Earth. – "And so," Fermi came to his overwhelming question, "if all this has been happening, they should have arrived here by now, so where are they?" – It was Leo Szilard, a man with an impish sense of humor, who supplied the perfect reply to the Fermi Paradox: "They are among us," he said, "but they call themselves Hungarians."

When the question was put to Edward Teller – who was particularly proud of his monogram, E.T. (abbreviation of extraterrestrial) – he looked worried, and said: "Von Kármán must have been talking."

According to György Marx, the extraterrestrial origin of the Hungarian scientists is proved by the fact that the names of Leó Szilárd, John von Neumann, and Theodore von Kármán cannot be found on the map of Budapest, but craters can be found on the Moon bearing their names: Szilard, Von Neumann, Von Kármán, and a crater on Mars, Von Kármán.

== See also ==
- Hungarian diaspora
- Hungarian mathematics
