= Erdős–Moser equation =

Unsolved problem in number theory

Unsolved problem in mathematics
Does the Erdős–Moser equation have solutions other than 1^{1}+2^{1}=3^{1}?
More unsolved problems in mathematics

In number theory, the Erdős–Moser equation is

$$1^k+2^k+\cdots+(m-1)^k=m^k,$$

where m and k are restricted to the positive integers—that is, it is considered as a Diophantine equation. The only known solution is 1^{1} + 2^{1} = 3^{1}, and Paul Erdős conjectured that no further solutions exist. Any further solutions must have m > 10^{10^{9}}.

Throughout this article, p refers exclusively to prime numbers.

== Constraints on solutions ==
In 1953, Leo Moser proved that, in any further solutions,

1. k is even,
2. p | (m − 1) implies (p − 1) | k,
3. p | (m + 1) implies (p − 1) | k,
4. p | (2m + 1) implies (p − 1) | k,
5. m − 1 is squarefree,
6. m + 1 is either squarefree or 4 times an odd squarefree number,
7. 2m − 1 is squarefree,
8. 2m + 1 is squarefree,
9. $\sum_{p|(m-1)} \frac{m-1}{p} \equiv -1 \pmod{m-1},$
10. $\sum_{p|(m+1)} \frac{m+1}{p} \equiv -2 \pmod{m+1} \quad \text{(if }m+1\text{ is even)},$
11. $\sum_{p|(2m-1)} \frac{2m-1}{p} \equiv -2 \pmod{2m-1},$
12. $\sum_{p|(2m+1)} \frac{2m+1}{p} \equiv -4 \pmod{2m+1},$ and
13. m > 10^{10^{6}}.

In 1966, it was additionally shown that

1. 6 ≤ k + 2 < m < 3 (k + 1) / 2, and
2. m − 1 cannot be prime.

In 1994, it was shown that

1. lcm(1,2,…,200) divides k,
2. m ≡ 3 (mod 2^{ord_{2}(k) + 3}), where ord_{2}(n) is the 2-adic valuation of n; equivalently, ord_{2}(m − 3) = ord_{2}(k) + 3,
3. for any odd prime p dividing m, we have k ≢ 0, 2 (mod p − 1),
4. any prime factor of m must be irregular and > 10000.

In 1999, Moser's method was refined to show that m > 1.485 × 10^{9,321,155}.

In 2002, it was shown that k must be a multiple of 2^{3} · 3# · 5# · 7# · 19# · 1000#, where the symbol # indicates the primorial; that is, n# is the product of all prime numbers ≤ n. This number exceeds 5.7462 × 10^{427}.

In 2009, it was shown that 2k / (2m − 3) must be a convergent of ln(2); in what the authors of that paper call "one of very few instances where a large scale computation of a numerical constant has an application", it was then determined that m > 2.7139 × 10^{1,667,658,416}.

In 2010, it was shown that

1. m ≡ 3 (mod 8) and m ≡ ±1 (mod 3), and
2. (m^{2} − 1) (4m^{2} − 1) / 12 has at least 4,990,906 prime factors, none of which are repeated.

The number 4,990,906 arises from the fact that ∑^{4990905}_{n=1} 1/p_{n} < 19/6 < ∑^{4990906}_{n=1} 1/p_{n}, where p_{n} is the n^{th} prime number.

== Moser's method ==
First, let p be a prime factor of m − 1. Leo Moser showed that this implies that p − 1 divides k and that

$1 + \frac{m - 1}{p} \equiv 0 \pmod{p},$	1

which upon multiplying by p yields

$$p + m - 1 \equiv 0 \pmod{p^2}.$$

This in turn implies that m − 1 must be squarefree. Furthermore, since nontrivial solutions have m − 1 > 2 and since all squarefree numbers in this range must have at least one odd prime factor, the assumption that p − 1 divides k implies that k must be even.

One congruence of the form (1) exists for each prime factor p of m − 1. Multiplying all of them together yields

$$\prod_{p|(m-1)} \left( 1 + \frac{m-1}{p} \right) \equiv 0 \pmod{m-1}.$$

Expanding out the product yields

$$1 + \sum_{p|(m-1)} \frac{m-1}{p} + (\text{higher-order terms}) \equiv 0 \pmod{m-1},$$

where the higher-order terms are products of multiple factors of the form (m − 1) / p, with different values of p in each factor. These terms are all divisible by m − 1, so they all drop out of the congruence, yielding

$$1 + \sum_{p|(m-1)} \frac{m-1}{p} \equiv 0 \pmod{m-1}.$$

Dividing out the modulus yields

$\frac{1}{m-1} + \sum_{p|(m-1)} \frac{1}{p} \equiv 0 \pmod{1}.$	2

Similar reasoning yields the congruences

$\frac{2}{m+1} + \sum_{p|(m+1)} \frac{1}{p} \equiv 0 \pmod{1} \quad \text{(if }m+1\text{ is even)},$	3

$\frac{2}{2m-1} + \sum_{p|(2m-1)} \frac{1}{p} \equiv 0 \pmod{1}, \quad \text{and}$	4

$\frac{4}{2m+1} + \sum_{p|(2m+1)} \frac{1}{p} \equiv 0 \pmod{1}.$	5

The congruences (2), (3), (4), and (5) are quite restrictive; for example, the only values of m < 1000 which satisfy (2) are 3, 7, and 43, and these are ruled out by (4).

We now split into two cases: either m + 1 is even, or it is odd.

In the case that m + 1 is even, adding the left-hand sides of the congruences (2), (3), (4), and (5) must yield an integer, and this integer must be at least 4. Furthermore, the Euclidean algorithm shows that no prime p > 3 can divide more than one of the numbers in the set {m − 1, m + 1, 2m − 1, 2m + 1}, and that 2 and 3 can divide at most two of these numbers. Letting M = (m − 1) (m + 1) (2m − 1) (2m + 1), we then have

$\frac{1}{m-1} + \frac{2}{m+1} + \frac{2}{2m-1} + \frac{4}{2m+1} + \sum_{p|M} \frac{1}{p} \geq 4 - \frac{1}{2} - \frac{1}{3} = 3.1666....$	6

Since there are no nontrivial solutions with m < 1000, the part of the LHS of (6) outside the sigma cannot exceed 0.006; we therefore have

$$\sum_{p|M} \frac{1}{p} > 3.16.$$

Therefore, if $\sum_{p \leq x} \frac{1}{p} < 3.16$, then $M > \prod_{p \leq x} p$. In Moser's original paper, bounds on the prime-counting function are used to observe that

$$\sum_{p \leq 10^7} \frac{1}{p} < 3.16.$$

Therefore, M must exceed the product of the first 10,000,000 primes. This in turn implies that m > 10^{10^{6}} in this case.

In the case that m + 1 is odd, we cannot use (3), so instead of (6) we obtain

$$\frac{1}{m-1} + \frac{2}{2m-1} + \frac{4}{2m+1} + \sum_{p|N} \frac{1}{p} \geq 3 - \frac{1}{3} = 2.666...,$$

where N = (m − 1) (2m − 1) (2m + 1). On the surface, this appears to be a weaker condition than (6), but since m + 1 is odd, the prime 2 cannot appear on the greater side of this inequality, and it turns out to be a stronger restriction on m than the other case.

Therefore, any nontrivial solutions have m > 10^{10^{6}}.

In 1999, this method was refined by using computers to replace the prime-counting estimates with exact computations; this yielded the bound m > 1.485 × 10^{9,321,155}.

== Bounding the ratio m / (k + 1) ==
Let S_{k}(m) = 1^{k} + 2^{k} + ⋯ + (m − 1)^{k}. Then the Erdős–Moser equation becomes S_{k}(m) = m^{k}.

=== Method 1: Integral comparisons ===
By comparing the sum S_{k}(m) to definite integrals of the function x^{k}, one can obtain the bounds 1 < m / (k + 1) < 3.

The sum S_{k}(m) = 1^{k} + 2^{k} + ⋯ + (m − 1)^{k} is the upper Riemann sum corresponding to the integral $\int_0^{m-1} x^k \, \mathrm{d}x$ in which the interval has been partitioned on the integer values of x, so we have

$$S_k(m) > \int_0^{m-1} x^k \; \mathrm{d}x.$$

By hypothesis, S_{k}(m) = m^{k}, so

$$m^k > \frac{(m-1)^{k+1}}{k+1},$$

which leads to

$\frac{m}{k+1} < \left( 1 + \frac{1}{m-1} \right)^{k+1}.$	7

Similarly, S_{k}(m) is the lower Riemann sum corresponding to the integral $\int_1^m x^k \, \mathrm{d}x$ in which the interval has been partitioned on the integer values of x, so we have

$$S_k(m) \leq \int_1^m x^k \; \mathrm{d}x.$$

By hypothesis, S_{k}(m) = m^{k}, so

$$m^k \leq \frac{m^{k+1} - 1}{k+1} < \frac{m^{k+1}}{k+1},$$

and so

$k+1 < m.$	8

Applying this to (7) yields

$$\frac{m}{k+1} < \left(1 + \frac{1}{m-1}\right)^m = \left(1 + \frac{1}{m-1}\right)^{m-1} \cdot \left(\frac{m}{m-1}\right) < e \cdot \frac{m}{m-1}.$$

Computation shows that there are no nontrivial solutions with m ≤ 10, so we have

$$\frac{m}{k+1} < e \cdot \frac{11}{11-1} < 3.$$

Combining this with (8) yields 1 < m / (k + 1) < 3, as desired.

=== Method 2: Algebraic manipulations ===
The upper bound m / (k + 1) < 3 can be reduced to m / (k + 1) < 3/2 using an algebraic method:

Let r be a positive integer. Then the binomial theorem yields

$$(\ell + 1)^{r+1} = \sum_{i=0}^{r+1} \binom{r+1}{i} \ell^{r+1-i}.$$

Summing over ℓ yields

$$\sum_{\ell=1}^{m-1} (\ell + 1)^{r+1} = \sum_{\ell=1}^{m-1} \left( \sum_{i=0}^{r+1} \binom{r+1}{i} \ell^{r+1-i} \right).$$

Reindexing on the left and rearranging on the right yields

$$\sum_{\ell=2}^{m} \ell^{r+1} = \sum_{i=0}^{r+1} \binom{r+1}{i} \sum_{\ell=1}^{m-1} \ell^{r+1-i}$$
$$\sum_{\ell=1}^{m} \ell^{r+1} = 1 + \sum_{i=0}^{r+1} \binom{r+1}{i} S_{r+1-i}(m)$$
$$S_{r+1}(m+1) - S_{r+1}(m) = 1 + (r+1) S_{r}(m) + \sum_{i=2}^{r+1} \binom{r+1}{i} S_{r+1-i}(m)$$

$m^{r+1} = 1 + (r+1) S_{r}(m) + \sum_{i=2}^{r+1} \binom{r+1}{i} S_{r+1-i}(m).$	9

Taking r = k yields

$$m^{k+1} = 1 + (k+1) S_{k}(m) + \sum_{i=2}^{k+1} \binom{k+1}{i} S_{k+1-i}(m).$$

By hypothesis, S_{k} = m^{k}, so

$$m^{k+1} = 1 + (k+1) m^k + \sum_{i=2}^{k+1} \binom{k+1}{i} S_{k+1-i}(m)$$

$m^k ( m - (k+1) ) = 1 + \sum_{i=2}^{k+1} \binom{k+1}{i} S_{k+1-i}(m).$	10

Since the RHS is positive, we must therefore have

$k + 1 < m.$	11

Returning to (9) and taking r = k − 1 yields

$$m^k = 1 + k \cdot S_{k-1}(m) + \sum_{i=2}^k \binom{k}{i} S_{k-i}(m)$$
$$m^k = 1 + \sum_{s=1}^k \binom{k}{s} S_{k-s}(m).$$

Substituting this into (10) to eliminate m^{k} yields

$$\left( 1 + \sum_{s=1}^k \binom{k}{s} S_{k-s}(m) \right) ( m - (k+1) ) = 1 + \sum_{i=2}^{k+1} \binom{k+1}{i} S_{k+1-i}(m).$$

Reindexing the sum on the right with the substitution i = s + 1 yields

$$\left( 1 + \sum_{s=1}^k \binom{k}{s} S_{k-s}(m) \right) ( m - (k+1) ) = 1 + \sum_{s=1}^k \binom{k+1}{s+1} S_{k-s}(m)$$
$$m - (k+1) + ( m - (k+1) ) \sum_{s=1}^k \binom{k}{s} S_{k-s}(m) = 1 + \sum_{s=1}^k \frac{k+1}{s+1} \binom{k}{s} S_{k-s}(m)$$

$m - k - 2 = \sum_{s=1}^k \left( \frac{k+1}{s+1} - m + (k+1) \right) \binom{k}{s} S_{k-s}(m).$	12

We already know from (11) that k + 1 < m. This leaves open the possibility that m = k + 2; however, substituting this into (12) yields

$$0 = \sum_{s=1}^k \left( \frac{k+1}{s+1} - 1 \right) \binom{k}{s} S_{k-s}(k+2)$$
$$0 = \sum_{s=1}^k \frac{k-s}{s+1} \binom{k}{s} S_{k-s}(k+2)$$
$$0 = \frac{k-k}{k+1} \binom{k}{k} S_{k-k}(k+2) + \sum_{s=1}^{k-1} \frac{k-s}{s+1} \binom{k}{s} S_{k-s}(k+2)$$
$$0 = 0 + \sum_{s=1}^{k-1} \frac{k-s}{s+1} \binom{k}{s} S_{k-s}(k+2),$$

which is impossible for k > 1, since the sum contains only positive terms. Therefore, any nontrivial solutions must have m ≠ k + 2; combining this with (11) yields

$$k + 2 < m.$$

We therefore observe that the left-hand side of (12) is positive, so

$0 < \sum_{s=1}^k \left( \frac{k+1}{s+1} - m + (k+1) \right) \binom{k}{s} S_{k-s}(m).$	13

Since k > 1, the sequence $\left\{ (k+1)/(s+1) - m + (k+1) \right\}_{s=1}^\infty$ is decreasing. This and (13) together imply that its first term (the term with s = 1) must be positive: if it were not, then every term in the sum would be nonpositive, and therefore so would the sum itself. Thus,

$$0 < \frac{k+1}{1+1} - m + (k+1),$$

which yields

$$m < \frac{3}{2} \cdot (k+1)$$

and therefore

$$\frac{m}{k+1} < \frac{3}{2},$$

as desired.

== Continued fractions ==
Any potential solutions to the equation must arise from the continued fraction of the natural logarithm of 2: specifically, 2k / (2m − 3) must be a convergent of that number.

By expanding the Taylor series of (1 − y)^{k} e^{ky} about y = 0, one finds

$$(1 - y)^k = e^{-ky} \left( 1 - \frac{k}{2} y^2 - \frac{k}{3} y^3 + \frac{k(k-2)}{8} y^4 + \frac{k(5k-6)}{30} y^5 + O(y^6) \right) \quad \text{as } y \rightarrow 0.$$

More elaborate analysis sharpens this to

$$\begin{align} e^{-ky} \left( 1 - \frac{k}{2} y^2 - \frac{k}{3} y^3 + \frac{k(k-2)}{8} y^4 + \frac{k(5k-6)}{30} y^5 - \frac{k^3}{6} y^6 \right) \\ < (1 - y)^k < e^{-ky} \left( 1 - \frac{k}{2} y^2 - \frac{k}{3} y^3 + \frac{k(k-2)}{8} y^4 + \frac{k^2}{2} y^5 \right) \end{align}$$	14

for k > 8 and 0 < y < 1.

The Erdős–Moser equation is equivalent to

$$1 = \sum_{j=1}^{m-1} \left( 1 - \frac{j}{m} \right)^k.$$

Applying (14) to each term in this sum yields

$$\begin{align}
T_0 - \frac{k}{2m^2} T_2 - \frac{k}{3m^3} T_3 + \frac{k(k-2)}{8m^4} T_4 + \frac{k(5k-6)}{30m^5} T_5 - \frac{k^3}{6m^6} T_6 \qquad \qquad \\
< \sum_{j=1}^{m-1} \left(1 - \frac{j}{m} \right)^k < T_0 - \frac{k}{2m^2} T_2 - \frac{k}{3m^3} T_3 + \frac{k(k-2)}{8m^4} T_4 + \frac{k^2}{2m^5} T_5,
\end{align}$$

where $T_n = \sum_{j=1}^{m-1} j^n z^j$ and z = e^{−k/m}. Further manipulation eventually yields

$\left\vert 1 - \frac{z}{1-z} + \frac{k}{2m^2}\frac{z^2+z}{(1-z)^3} + \frac{k}{3m^3}\frac{z^3+4z^2+z}{(1-z)^4} - \frac{k(k-2)}{8m^4}\frac{z^4+11z^3+11z^2+z}{(1-z)^5} \right\vert < \frac{110000}{m^3}.$	15

We already know that k/m is bounded as m → ∞; making the ansatz k/m = c + O(1/m), and therefore z = e^{−c} + O(1/m), and substituting it into (15) yields

$$1 - \frac{1}{e^c - 1} = O\left(\frac{1}{m}\right) \quad \text{as } m \rightarrow \infty;$$

therefore c = ln(2). We therefore have

$\frac{k}{m} = \ln(2) + \frac{a}{m} + \frac{b}{m^2} + O\left(\frac{1}{m^3}\right) \quad \text{as } m \rightarrow \infty,$	16

and so

$$\frac{1}{z} = e^{k/m} = 2 + \frac{2a}{m} + \frac{a^2+2b}{m^2} + O\left(\frac{1}{m^3}\right) \quad \text{as } m \rightarrow \infty.$$

Substituting these formulas into (15) yields a = −3 ln(2) / 2 and b = (3 ln(2) − 25/12) ln(2). Putting these into (16) yields

$$\frac{k}{m} = \ln(2) \left(1 - \frac{3}{2m} - \frac{\frac{25}{12} - 3\ln(2)}{m^2} + O\left(\frac{1}{m^3}\right) \right) \quad \text{as } m \rightarrow \infty.$$

The term O(1/m^{3}) must be bounded effectively. To that end, we define the function

$$F(x,\lambda) = \left.\left( 1 - \frac{1}{t-1} + \frac{x\lambda}{2} \frac{t+t^2}{(t-1)^3}
+ \frac{x^2\lambda}{3} \frac{t+4t^2+t^3}{(t-1)^4}
- \frac{x^2\lambda(\lambda-2x)}{8} \frac{t+11t^2+11t^3+t^4}{(t-1)^5}
\right) \right\vert_{t=e^\lambda}.$$

The inequality (15) then takes the form

$\left\vert F \left( \frac{1}{m} , \frac{k}{m} \right) \right\vert < \frac{110000}{m^3},$	17

and we further have

$$\begin{align}
F(x, \ln(2) (1 - \tfrac{3}{2}x \, \phantom{- \; 0.004x^2})) &> \phantom{-}0.005\phantom{15}x^2 - 100x^3 \quad \text{and} \\
F(x, \ln(2) (1 - \tfrac{3}{2}x - 0.004x^2)) &< -0.00015x^2 + 100x^3
\end{align}$$

for x ≤ 0.01. Therefore

$$\begin{align}
F \left( \frac{1}{m} , \ln(2) \left( 1 - \frac{3}{2m} \, \phantom{ \; - \frac{0.004}{m^2} } \right) \right) &> \phantom{-}\frac{110000}{m^3} \quad \text{for } m > 2202 \cdot 10^4 \quad \text{and} \\
F \left( \frac{1}{m} , \ln(2) \left( 1 - \frac{3}{2m} - \frac{0.004}{m^2} \right) \right) &< - \frac{110000}{m^3} \quad \text{for } m > \phantom{0}734 \cdot 10^6.
\end{align}$$

Comparing these with (17) then shows that, for m > 10^{9}, we have

$$\ln(2) \left( 1 - \frac{3}{2m} - \frac{0.004}{m^2} \right) < \frac{k}{m} < \ln(2) \left( 1 - \frac{3}{2m} \right),$$

and therefore

$$0 < \ln(2) - \frac{2k}{2m-3} < \frac{0.0111}{(2m-3)^2}.$$

Recalling that Moser showed that indeed m > 10^{9}, and then invoking Legendre's theorem on continued fractions, finally proves that 2k / (2m − 3) must be a convergent to ln(2). Leveraging this result, 31 billion decimal digits of ln(2) can be used to exclude any nontrivial solutions below 10^{10^{9}}.

== See also ==
- List of conjectures by Paul Erdős
- List of things named after Paul Erdős
- List of unsolved problems in mathematics
- Sums of powers
- Faulhaber's formula – Expression for sums of powers
