= Erdős sumset conjecture =

Conjecture in additive combinations about subsets of natural numbers

In additive combinatorics, the Erdős sumset conjecture is a conjecture which states that if a subset $A$ of the natural numbers $\mathbb{N}$ has a positive upper density then there are two infinite subsets $B$ and $C$ of $\mathbb{N}$ such that $A$ contains the sumset $B+C$. It was posed by Paul Erdős, and was proven in 2019 in a paper by Joel Moreira, Florian Richter and Donald Robertson.

== See also ==
- List of conjectures by Paul Erdős
