= Vance Faber =

American mathematician

- Born: December 1, 1944 (age 81); Buffalo, New York, US
- Education: Washington University in St. Louis
- Scientific career
- Fields: Mathematician

Vance Faber (born December 1, 1944, in Buffalo, New York) is a mathematician, known for his work in combinatorics, applied linear algebra and image processing.

Faber received his Ph.D. in 1971 from Washington University in St. Louis. His advisor was Franklin Tepper Haimo.

Faber was a professor at University of Colorado at Denver during the 1970s. He spent parts of 3 years at the National Center for Atmospheric Research in Boulder on a NASA postdoctoral fellowship, where he wrote a second thesis on the numerical solution of the Shallow Water Equations under the direction of numerical analyst Paul Swarztrauber. In the 1980s and 1990s, he was on the staff of the Computer Research and Applications Group at Los Alamos National Laboratory. He was Group Leader from 1990 to 1995.

From 1998 to 2003 Faber was CTO and Head of Research for three different small companies building imaging software: LizardTech, Mapping Science and Cytoprint. He is currently a consultant.

In 1981, Gene Golub offered a US$500 prize for “the construction of a 3-term conjugate gradient like descent method for non-symmetric real matrices or a proof that there can be no such method”. Faber and his co-author Thomas A. Manteuffel won this prize for their 1984 paper, in which they gave conditions for the existence of such a method and showed that, in general, there can be no such method.

== See also ==
- Erdős–Faber–Lovász conjecture
