= Erdős–Gyárfás conjecture =

Unproven conjecture in graph theory

Markström's graph
- Markström's 24-vertex cubic planar graph with no 4- or 8-cycles, found in a computer search for counterexamples to the Erdős–Gyárfás conjecture. It has, however, cycles with 16 vertices.
- Vertices: 24
- Edges: 36
- Radius: 5
- Diameter: 6
- Girth: 3
- Automorphisms: 3

Unsolved problem in mathematics
Must every cubic graph contain a simple cycle of length a power of two?
More unsolved problems in mathematics

In graph theory, the unproven Erdős–Gyárfás conjecture, made in 1995 by mathematician Paul Erdős and his collaborator András Gyárfás, states that every graph with minimum degree 3 contains a simple cycle whose length is a power of two. Erdős offered a prize of $100 for proving the conjecture, or $50 for a counterexample; it is one of many conjectures of Erdős.

If the conjecture is false, a counterexample would take the form of a graph with minimum degree three having no power-of-two cycles. It is known through computer searches of Gordon Royle and Klas Markström that any counterexample must have at least 17 vertices, and any cubic counterexample must have at least 30 vertices. Markström's searches found four graphs on 24 vertices in which the only power-of-two cycles have 16 vertices. One of these four graphs is planar; however, the Erdős–Gyárfás conjecture is now known to be true for the special case of 3-connected cubic planar graphs.

The conjecture remains open for bipartite cubic graphs. This case has been approached through several related computational and structural directions. In work presented at the 14th Workshop on Graph Theory in Szklarska Poręba, Poland, in 2011, Pouria Salehi Nowbandegani and Hossein Esfandiari proved by computer search that a cubic bipartite counterexample must have at least 30 vertices. A 2013 result of Heckman and Krakovski settles a different but overlapping cubic restriction—3-connected cubic planar graphs—but does not settle the general cubic bipartite case.

Weaker results relating the degree of a graph to unavoidable sets of cycle lengths are known: there is a set $S$ of lengths, with $|S|=O(n^{0.99})$, such that every graph with average degree ten or more contains a cycle with its length in $S$, and every graph whose average degree is exponential in the iterated logarithm of $n$ necessarily contains a cycle whose length is a power of two. The conjecture is also known to be true for planar claw-free graphs and for graphs that avoid large induced stars and satisfy additional constraints on their degrees.
