= Cameron–Erdős conjecture =

Theorem in combinatorics

In combinatorics, the Cameron–Erdős conjecture (now a theorem) is the statement that the number of sum-free sets contained in $[N] = \{1,\ldots,N\}$ is $O\big({2^{N/2}}\big).$

The sum of two odd numbers is even, so a set of odd numbers is always sum-free. There are $\lceil N/2\rceil$ odd numbers in [N ], and so $2^{N/2}$ subsets of odd numbers in [N ]. The Cameron–Erdős conjecture says that this counts a constant proportion of the sum-free sets.

The conjecture was stated by Peter Cameron and Paul Erdős in 1988. It was proved by Ben Green and independently by Alexander Sapozhenko in 2003.

== See also ==
- Erdős conjecture
