= Stefan Burr =

American mathematician

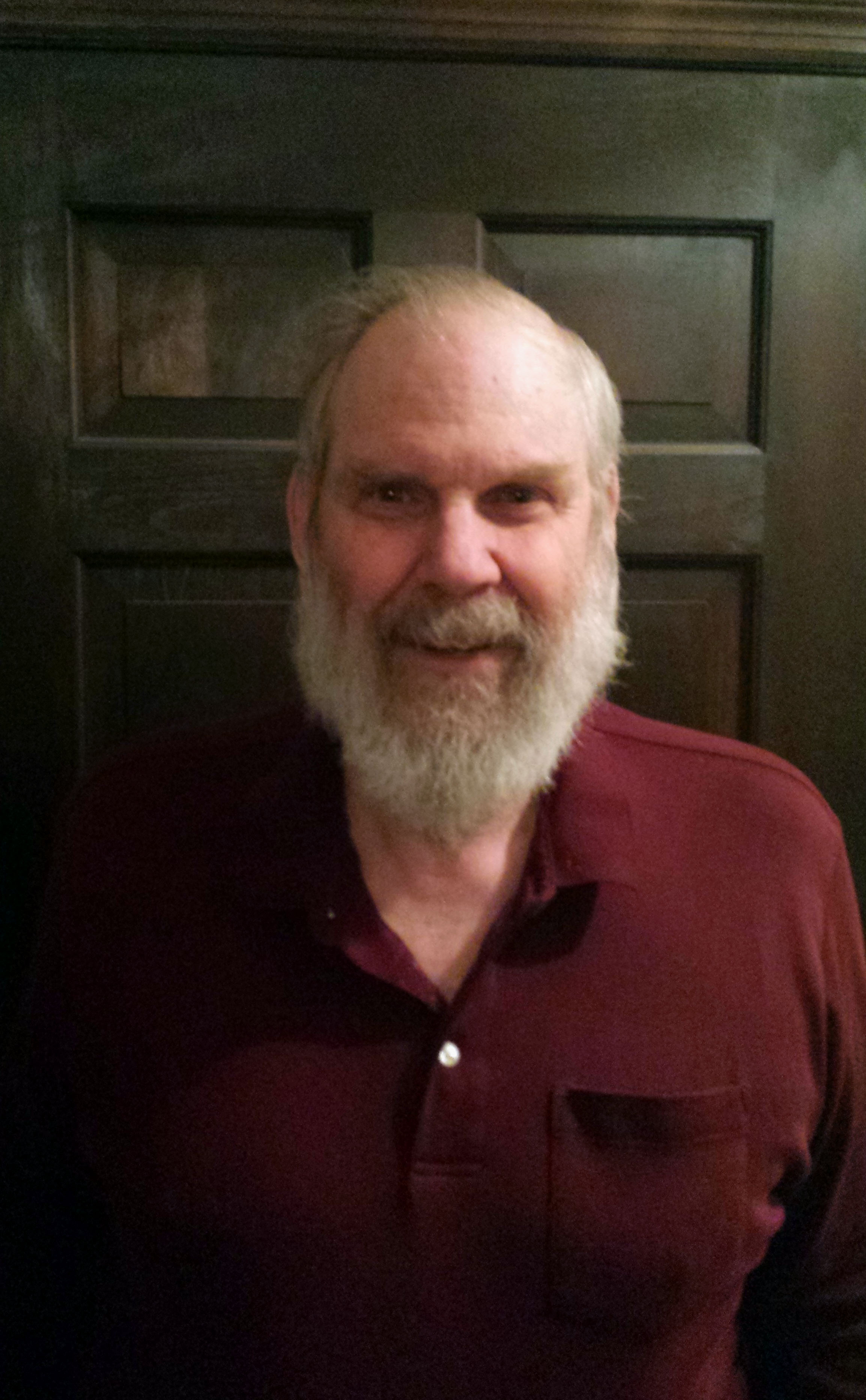
- Burr in 2015
- Born: Stefan Andrus Burr; 1940 (age 85–86)
- Education: University of California, Berkeley (A.B., Mathematics); Princeton University (M.A.; Ph.D. Mathematics, 1969)
- Known for: Ramsey Theory; Number theory
- Scientific career
- Fields: Mathematics and Computer Science
- Workplaces: The City College of New York; AT&T Long Lines
- Doctoral advisor: Bernard Morris Dwork

Stefan Andrus Burr (born 1940) is a mathematician and computer scientist, specializing in graph theory and number theory, particularly Ramsey theory. He is a retired professor of Computer Science at The City College of New York.

== Career ==
He did his undergraduate studies at University of California, Berkeley, graduating with a Bachelor of Arts in Mathematics with Highest Honors in 1961 June. He was a member of their team for the William Lowell Putnam Mathematical Competition on 1958 November 22, where the team received an honorable mention; 1959 November 21, where he individually received an honorable mention; and 1960 December 3, where the team won first prize and he additionally received an honorable mention. As a member of the class of 1961, he received the Dorothea Klumpke Roberts Prize in Mathematics in 1960. As a student there, he joined the Mathematical Association of America in 1960 April/May.

He graduated from Princeton University with a Master of Arts in 1963 and a PhD in 1968, both in Mathematics. His PhD thesis, An Elementary Solution of the Waring-Goldbach Problem (1968 or 1969) was advised by Bernard Morris Dwork.

While working on his PhD at Princeton, he had a job as a Scientific Programmer for Lockheed MSC (c. 1965). Afterwards, starting c. 1966, he had a job as a member of the technical staff at Bell Telephone Laboratories, then moved to American Telephone & Telegraph (AT&T) Long Lines c. 1975, where he worked as a Staff Supervisor until c. 1978.

Afterwards, c. 1979, he became a member of the faculty of City College, part of the City University of New York (CUNY) system, in the Department of Computer Science (and perhaps briefly in the Department of Mathematics). In 1982, he spent 3 months from May to August visiting the University of Coimbra in Portugal as a Fulbright Scholar, where he lectured and researched computer science. He may have spent some time at Lehman College c. 1996 – c. 1998. He retired after teaching in the Fall 2006 semester.

He became Mathematics Vice-Chair of the New York Academy of Sciences in January 1988, became Mathematics Chair in 1990, and retired from the position in June 1992. He became a managing editor of the Journal of Graph Theory in 1991, and retired from the position c. 1997.

Many of his publications involve problems from the field of Ramsey theory. He has published 27 papers with Paul Erdős. The Burr–Erdős conjecture, published as a conjecture by Burr and Erdős in 1975, solved only in 2015, states that sparse graphs have linearly growing Ramsey numbers.

== Selected publications ==
- Burr, Stefan A. (1973). "On uniform elementary estimates of arithmetic sums". Proceedings of the American Mathematical Society. 39 (3): 497–502. doi:10.1090/s0002-9939-1973-0314784-8. eISSN 1088-6826. ISSN 0002-9939. JSTOR 2039582. MR 0314784. EBSCOhost 21907347.
- Burr, S. A.; Erdős, P.; Spencer, J. H. (August 1975). "Ramsey theorems for multiple copies of graphs". Transactions of the American Mathematical Society. 209: 87–99. doi:10.1090/s0002-9947-1975-0409255-0. eISSN 1088-6850. ISSN 0002-9947. JSTOR 1997371. MR 0409255.
- Burr, S. A.; Erdős, P.; Faudree, R. J.; Rousseau, C. C.; Schelp, R. H. (February 1982). "Ramsey numbers for the pair sparse graph-path or cycle". Transactions of the American Mathematical Society. 269 (2): 501–512. doi:10.1090/s0002-9947-1982-0637704-5. eISSN 1088-6850. ISSN 0002-9947. JSTOR 1998461. MR 0637704.
