= Burr–Erdős conjecture =

In mathematics, the Burr–Erdős conjecture was a problem concerning the Ramsey number of sparse graphs. The conjecture is named after Stefan Burr and Paul Erdős, and is one of many conjectures named after Erdős; it states that the Ramsey number of graphs in any sparse family of graphs should grow linearly in the number of vertices of the graph.

The conjecture was proven by Choongbum Lee. Thus it is now a theorem.

== Definitions ==
If G is an undirected graph, then the degeneracy of G is the minimum number p such that every subgraph of G contains a vertex of degree p or smaller. A graph with degeneracy p is called p-degenerate. Equivalently, a p-degenerate graph is a graph that can be reduced to the empty graph by repeatedly removing a vertex of degree p or smaller.

It follows from Ramsey's theorem that for any graph G there exists a least integer $r(G)$, the Ramsey number of G, such that any complete graph on at least $r(G)$ vertices whose edges are coloured red or blue contains a monochromatic copy of G. For instance, the Ramsey number of a triangle is 6: no matter how the edges of a complete graph on six vertices are colored red or blue, there is always either a red triangle or a blue triangle.

== The conjecture ==
In 1973, Stefan Burr and Paul Erdős made the following conjecture:

For every integer p there exists a constant c_{p} so that any p-degenerate graph G on n vertices has Ramsey number at most c_{p} n.

That is, if an n-vertex graph G is p-degenerate, then a monochromatic copy of G should exist in every two-edge-colored complete graph on c_{p} n vertices.

== Known results ==
Before the full conjecture was proved, it was first settled in some special cases. It was proven for bounded-degree graphs by Chvátal et al. (1983); their proof led to a very high value of c_{p}, and improvements to this constant were made by Eaton (1998) and Graham, Rödl & Rucínski (2000). More generally, the conjecture was known to be true for p-arrangeable graphs, which includes graphs with bounded maximum degree, planar graphs and graphs that do not contain a subdivision of K_{p}. It was also known for subdivided graphs, graphs in which no two adjacent vertices have degree greater than two.

For arbitrary graphs, the Ramsey number was known to be bounded by a function that grows only slightly superlinearly. Specifically, Fox & Sudakov (2009) showed that there exists a constant c_{p} such that, for any p-degenerate n-vertex graph G,

$$r(G) \leq 2^{c_p \sqrt{\log n}} n.$$
