= Erdős (surname) =

Erdős, Erdos, or Erdoes is a Hungarian surname.

== Other people with the surname ==
- Ágnes Erdős (1950–2021), Hungarian politician
- Brad Erdos (born 1990), Canadian football player
- Éva Erdős (born 1964), Hungarian handball player
- Mary Callahan Erdoes (born 1967), American banker
- Paul Erdős (1913–1996), Hungarian mathematician
- Richárd Erdős (1881–1912), Hungarian opera singer, father of Richard
- Richard Erdoes (1912–2008), Hungarian-Austrian born American artist
- Sándor Erdős (born 1947), Hungarian fencer
- Thomas Erdos (born 1965), Brazilian auto racing driver
- Todd Erdos (born 1973), American baseball player
- Viktor Erdős (born 1987), Hungarian chess grandmaster

== See also ==
- Erdő
- Erdődy
