= Erdős–Tetali theorem =

Existence theorem for economical additive bases of every order

In additive number theory, an area of mathematics, the Erdős–Tetali theorem is an existence theorem concerning economical additive bases of every order. More specifically, it states that for every fixed integer $h \geq 2$, there exists a subset of the natural numbers $\mathcal{B} \subseteq \mathbb{N}$ satisfying

$$r_{\mathcal{B},h}(n) \asymp \log n,$$
where $r_{\mathcal{B},h}(n)$ denotes the number of ways that a natural number n can be expressed as the sum of h elements of B.

The theorem is named after Paul Erdős and Prasad V. Tetali, who published it in 1990.

== Motivation ==
The original motivation for this result is attributed to a problem posed by S. Sidon in 1932 on economical bases. An additive basis $\mathcal{B}\subseteq\mathbb{N}$ is called economical (or sometimes thin) when it is an additive basis of order h and

$$r_{\mathcal{B},h}(n) \ll_{\varepsilon} n^\varepsilon$$

for every $\varepsilon > 0$. In other words, these are additive bases that use as few numbers as possible to represent a given n, and yet represent every natural number. Related concepts include $B_h[g]$-sequences and the Erdős–Turán conjecture on additive bases.

Sidon's question was whether an economical basis of order 2 exists. A positive answer was given by P. Erdős in 1956, settling the case h = 2 of the theorem. Although the general version was believed to be true, no complete proof appeared in the literature before the paper by Erdős and Tetali.

== Ideas in the proof ==
The proof is an instance of the probabilistic method, and can be divided into three main steps. First, one starts by defining a random sequence $\omega \subseteq \mathbb{N}$ by

$$\Pr(n\in \omega) = C\cdot n^{\frac{1}{h} - 1} (\log n)^{\frac{1}{h}},$$

where $C>0$ is some large real constant, $h\geq 2$ is a fixed integer and n is sufficiently large so that the above formula is well-defined. A detailed discussion on the probability space associated with this type of construction may be found on Halberstam & Roth (1983). Secondly, one then shows that the expected value of the random variable $r_{\omega,h}(n)$ has the order of log. That is,

$$\mathbb{E}(r_{\omega,h}(n)) \asymp \log n.$$

Finally, one shows that $r_{\omega,h}(n)$ almost surely concentrates around its mean. More explicitly:

$$\Pr\big(\exists c_1,c_2>0 ~|~ \text{for all large } n\in\mathbb{N} ,~ c_1\mathbb{E}(r_{\omega,h}(n)) \leq r_{\omega,h}(n) \leq c_2\mathbb{E}(r_{\omega,h}(n))\big) = 1$$

This is the critical step of the proof. Originally it was dealt with by means of Janson's inequality, a type of concentration inequality for multivariate polynomials. Tao & Vu (2006) present this proof with a more sophisticated two-sided concentration inequality by V. Vu (2000), thus relatively simplifying this step. Alon & Spencer (2016) classify this proof as an instance of the Poisson paradigm.

== Relation to the Erdős–Turán conjecture on additive bases ==
Unsolved problem in mathematics
Let $h\geq 2$ be an integer. If $\mathcal{B}\subseteq\mathbb{N}$ is an infinite set such that $r_{\mathcal{B},h}(n)>0$ for every n, does this imply that:

$\limsup_{n\to\infty} \frac{r_{\mathcal{B},h}(n)}{\log n} > 0$?

More unsolved problems in mathematics

The original Erdős–Turán conjecture on additive bases states, in its most general form, that if $\mathcal{B}\subseteq\mathbb{N}$ is an additive basis of order h then

$$\limsup_{n\to \infty} r_{\mathcal{B},h}(n) = \infty;$$

that is, $r_{\mathcal{B},h}(n)$ cannot be bounded. In his 1956 paper, P. Erdős asked whether it could be the case that

$$\limsup_{n\to\infty} \frac{r_{\mathcal{B},2}(n)}{\log n} > 0$$

whenever $\mathcal{B}\subseteq\mathbb{N}$ is an additive basis of order 2. In other words, this is saying that $r_{\mathcal{B},2}(n)$ is not only unbounded, but that no function smaller than log can dominate $r_{\mathcal{B},2}(n)$. The question naturally extends to $h\geq 3$, making it a stronger form of the Erdős–Turán conjecture on additive bases. In a sense, what is being conjectured is that there are no additive bases substantially more economical than those guaranteed to exist by the Erdős–Tetali theorem.

== Further developments ==
=== Computable economical bases ===
All the known proofs of Erdős–Tetali theorem are, by the nature of the infinite probability space used, non-constructive proofs. However, Kolountzakis (1995) showed the existence of a recursive set $\mathcal{R}\subseteq \mathbb{N}$ satisfying $r_{\mathcal{R},2}(n) \asymp \log n$ such that $\mathcal{R}\cap\{0,1,\ldots ,n\}$ takes polynomial time in n to be computed. The question for $h\geq 3$ remains open.

=== Economical subbases ===
Given an arbitrary additive basis $\mathcal{A}\subseteq\mathbb{N}$, one can ask whether there exists $\mathcal{B}\subseteq\mathcal{A}$ such that $\mathcal{B}$ is an economical basis. V. Vu (2000) showed that this is the case for Waring bases $\mathbb{N}^{\wedge} k := \{0^k, 1^k, 2^k,\ldots \}$, where for every fixed k there are economical subbases of $\mathbb{N}^{\wedge}k$ of order $s$ for every $s \geq s_k$, for some large computable constant $s_k$.

=== Growth rates other than log ===
Another possible question is whether similar results apply for functions other than log. That is, fixing an integer $h\geq 2$, for which functions f can we find a subset of the natural numbers $\mathcal{B}\subseteq \mathbb{N}$ satisfying $r_{\mathcal{B},h}(n) \asymp f(n)$? It follows from a result of C. Táfula (2019) that if f is a locally integrable, positive real function satisfying

- $\frac{1}{x}\int_{1}^{x} f(t) \,\mathrm{d}t \asymp f(x)$, and
- $\log x \ll f(x) \ll x^{\frac{1}{h-1}}(\log x)^{-\varepsilon}$ for some $\varepsilon > 0$,

then there exists an additive basis $\mathcal{B}\subseteq \mathbb{N}$ of order h which satisfies $r_{\mathcal{B},h}(n) \asymp f(n)$. The minimal case f(x) = log x recovers Erdős–Tetali's theorem.

== See also ==
- Erdős–Fuchs theorem: For any non-zero $C\in \mathbb{R}$, there is no set $\mathcal{B}\subseteq \mathbb{N}$ which satisfies $\textstyle{\sum_{n\leq x} r_{\mathcal{B},2}(n) = Cx + o\left(x^{1/4} \log(x)^{-1/2}\right)}$.
- Erdős–Turán conjecture on additive bases: If $\mathcal{B}\subseteq\mathbb{N}$ is an additive basis of order 2, then $r_{\mathcal{B},2}(n) \neq O(1)$.
- Waring's problem, the problem of representing numbers as sums of k-powers, for fixed $k\geq 2$.
