= Erdős–Turán conjecture =

Erdős–Turán conjecture may refer to:

- Szemerédi's theorem
- Erdős conjecture on arithmetic progressions
- Erdős–Turán conjecture on additive bases
