= Janson inequality =

Probability inequality for dependent events

In probability theory, Janson's inequality (also the Janson inequalities) is a collection of related inequalities that give exponential upper bounds on the probability that none, or unusually few, of a collection of dependent events occur. Each event is that a fixed set of elements is contained in a random subset, where elements are included independently. The inequalities are named after Svante Janson, who proved them in 1987–1990, and they are a central tool of the probabilistic method, particularly in the theory of random graphs.

When the events are only weakly dependent, the bounds show that the probability that none of them occurs is roughly the same as if they were independent, matching the lower bound given by the Harris inequality. In this sense Janson's inequality plays a role for sums of dependent indicator variables similar to that of the Chernoff bound for independent ones. The inequalities bound only the lower tail of the number of events that occur; the corresponding upper tail behaves very differently and is much harder to control. Research on the inequality continues along several lines: sharper and exact estimates of the probability that no event occurs, extensions to more general dependent events, and the contrasting behavior of the upper tail.

== Statement ==
=== A motivating example ===
A typical question is how likely it is that the random graph $G(n,p)$, in which each of the possible edges between $n$ vertices is present independently with probability $p$, contains no triangle. Each potential triangle appears exactly when all three of its edges are present. These events are not independent, because two triangles can share an edge, but most pairs of potential triangles share no edges at all. Janson's inequality bounds the probability that no triangle appears using only two quantities: the expected number of triangles, and a measure of how much the triangles overlap.

=== Setting ===
In general, let $\Gamma$ be a finite set, and let $\Gamma_p$ be a random subset of $\Gamma$ obtained by including each element $i \in \Gamma$ independently with probability $p_i$. Let $S$ be a family of subsets of $\Gamma$; in the example, $\Gamma$ is the set of possible edges and $S$ consists of the edge sets of the potential triangles. For $A \in S$, let $I_A$ be the indicator random variable of the event $A \subseteq \Gamma_p$, and let $X = \sum_{A \in S} I_A$ be the number of sets in $S$ that are contained in $\Gamma_p$. Define

$$\lambda = \operatorname E[X] = \sum_{A \in S} \Pr(A \subseteq \Gamma_p),$$

$$\Delta = \frac{1}{2}\sum_{A \neq B,\ A \cap B \neq \emptyset} \operatorname E[I_A I_B], \qquad \bar{\Delta} = \lambda + 2\Delta.$$

Here $\lambda$ is the expected number of sets that occur. The quantity $\Delta$ measures the dependence between them: it adds up, over all unordered pairs of distinct sets that overlap, the probability that both occur. Pairs of sets that do not overlap depend on disjoint groups of elements, so their events are independent and they contribute nothing.

=== The inequalities ===
With this notation,

$$\Pr(X = 0) \leq e^{-\lambda + \Delta}$$

and

$$\Pr(X = 0) \leq e^{-\lambda^2/\bar{\Delta}}.$$

The first bound is the more useful one when $\Delta$ is small compared with $\lambda$; the second is better when $\Delta > \lambda/2$. A slightly sharper form of the first bound, due to Boppana and Spencer, is

$\Pr(X = 0) \leq \exp\left(\frac{\Delta}{1 - \varepsilon}\right) \prod_{A \in S} \left(1 - \Pr(A \subseteq \Gamma_p)\right), \qquad \varepsilon = \max_{A \in S} \Pr(A \subseteq \Gamma_p).$

=== Interpretation ===
If the events $A \subseteq \Gamma_p$ were independent, the probability that none of them occurs would be $\prod_{A \in S} \left(1 - \Pr(A \subseteq \Gamma_p)\right)$, which is at most $e^{-\lambda}$. The first inequality says that, even with dependence, the probability that none of them occurs exceeds this bound $e^{-\lambda}$ by at most a factor of $e^{\Delta}$. When the overlaps are rare, so that $\Delta$ is small compared with $\lambda$, the events behave almost as if they were independent. In that regime the probability that none occurs is close to $e^{-\lambda}$, the probability that a Poisson random variable with mean $\lambda$ equals zero; this is the "Poisson paradigm" of Alon and Spencer, an idea reflected in the title of Janson's 1990 paper, "Poisson approximation for large deviations".

The second inequality covers the case of strong dependence. Since overlapping pairs are the only source of correlation, the variance of $X$ is at most $\bar{\Delta}$, so the second bound has the form $\exp(-(\operatorname E X)^2/\bar{\Delta})$, much like a Gaussian tail estimate for a deviation of size $\operatorname E X$. It improves exponentially on the bound $\Pr(X = 0) \leq \operatorname{Var}(X)/(\operatorname E X)^2$ given by Chebyshev's inequality and the second moment method; Janson and Warnke describe it as a one-sided exponential form of Chebyshev's inequality.

=== Sharpness ===
The events $\{A \subseteq \Gamma_p\}$ are all increasing, so by the Harris inequality their complements are positively correlated, which gives the lower bound

$$\Pr(X = 0) \geq \prod_{A \in S} \left(1 - \Pr(A \subseteq \Gamma_p)\right).$$

If every event has probability tending to zero, the right-hand side is $e^{-(1+o(1))\lambda}$. Consequently, when in addition $\Delta = o(\lambda)$, the first Janson bound matches this lower bound and $\Pr(X = 0) = e^{-(1+o(1))\lambda}$: the events behave as if they were independent.

=== Lower tail ===
Janson also extended the inequality to bound the probability that $X$ is substantially smaller than its mean. Let $\varphi(x) = (1 + x) \ln(1 + x) - x$. For $0 \leq t \leq \lambda$,

$$\Pr(X \leq \lambda - t) \leq e^{-\varphi(-t/\lambda)\lambda^2/\bar{\Delta}} \leq e^{-t^2/\left(2\bar{\Delta}\right)}.$$

When the sets in $S$ are pairwise disjoint, $\Delta = 0$ and the indicators are independent, and the bound reduces to a one-sided Chernoff bound. In 2016 Janson and Lutz Warnke showed that, when both the dependence and the individual probabilities are small, the exponent in this bound is asymptotically optimal, settling a question left open since Janson's 1990 paper.

=== Upper tail ===
The bounds above concern the lower tail of $X$. For the upper tail, the probability that $X$ is much larger than its mean, no comparably simple estimate is available; Janson and Ruciński called this the "infamous upper tail" problem and surveyed approaches to it.

Harel, Mousset and Samotij determined the logarithmic upper tail probability asymptotically in two central cases, for every fixed $\delta > 0$. Let $X$ be the number of k-term arithmetic progressions ($k \ge 3$) in the random subset of $\{1, \dots, N\}$ that contains each element independently with probability $p = p(N)$. Then

$$\lim_{N\to\infty} \frac{-\log \Pr\left(X \ge (1+\delta)\operatorname E[X]\right)}{N p^{k/2} \log(1/p)} = \sqrt{\delta} \quad \text{if } N^{-1}\log N \ll p^{k/2} \ll 1,$$
$$\lim_{N\to\infty} \frac{-\log \Pr\left(X \ge (1+\delta)\operatorname E[X]\right)}{\operatorname E[X]} = \varphi(\delta) \quad \text{if } N^{-1} \ll p^{k/2} \ll N^{-1}\log N,$$

with $\varphi$ as above. In the first range the upper tail is driven by the appearance of a long interval in the random set; in the second, $X$ behaves like a Poisson random variable.

Now let $X$ be the number of cliques on $r \ge 3$ vertices in the random graph $G(n,p)$, with $n^{-1}(\log n)^{1/(r-2)} \ll p^{(r-1)/2} \ll 1$. Then

$$\lim_{n\to\infty} \frac{-\log \Pr\left(X \ge (1+\delta)\operatorname E[X]\right)}{n^2 p^{r-1} \log(1/p)} = \begin{cases} \delta^{2/r}/2 & \text{if } n p^{r-1} \to 0, \\ \min\left\{\delta^{2/r}/2,\ \delta/r\right\} & \text{if } n p^{r-1} \to \infty, \end{cases}$$

with an explicit formula in the intermediate case $n p^{r-1} \to c \in (0,\infty)$. The two terms correspond to the random graph containing an unusually large clique or a "hub" of vertices adjacent to almost all others. This sharpens earlier work of Chatterjee and of DeMarco and Kahn, who had independently determined this probability up to a constant factor in the exponent.

== Proofs ==
Janson's original proof was analytic, based on Laplace transforms. Most textbooks instead give a short, elementary argument due to Ravi Boppana and Joel Spencer, whose structure resembles the proof of the Lovász local lemma.

The strategy is to consider the events one at a time and measure how much the earlier ones can influence each new one. List the sets of $S$ as $A_1, \dots, A_m$, and let $B_i$ be the event $A_i \subseteq \Gamma_p$. By the chain rule, the probability that none of the events occurs is a product of conditional probabilities:

$$\Pr(X = 0) = \prod_{i=1}^m \Pr\left(\overline{B_i} \,\Big|\, \overline{B_1} \cap \dots \cap \overline{B_{i-1}}\right).$$

Each factor is the probability that $B_i$ fails, given that all the earlier events have failed. If the events were independent, the conditioning would have no effect. The key estimate shows that it has only a small effect, controlled by the earlier sets that overlap $A_i$:

$$\Pr\left(B_i \,\Big|\, \overline{B_1} \cap \dots \cap \overline{B_{i-1}}\right) \geq \Pr(B_i) - \sum_{j < i,\ A_j \cap A_i \neq \emptyset} \Pr(B_i \cap B_j).$$

To prove it, split the earlier events into those whose sets are disjoint from $A_i$ and those whose sets overlap it. The disjoint ones depend on different elements of $\Gamma$, so $B_i$ is independent of them. A union bound over the overlapping ones then shows that the conditioning can lower the probability of $B_i$ by at most the sum of the terms $\Pr(B_i \cap B_j)$; the Harris inequality is what allows the conditioning on the disjoint events to be dropped from each of these terms.

Using $1 - x \leq e^{-x}$, each factor in the product is at most $\exp\left(-\Pr(B_i) + \sum_{j<i,\ A_j \cap A_i \neq \emptyset} \Pr(B_i \cap B_j)\right)$. Multiplying the factors adds the exponents. The terms $\Pr(B_i)$ sum to $\lambda$, and because each overlapping pair is counted only once, when the later of the two sets is reached, the correction terms sum to exactly $\Delta$. This gives $\Pr(X = 0) \leq e^{-\lambda + \Delta}$.

The other bounds follow from this one. Applying it to a random subfamily of $S$, in which each set is kept independently with a suitably chosen probability, reduces the dependence enough to give the second inequality up to a constant factor in the exponent. Spencer gave another proof of the second inequality that loses a factor of 1/2 in the exponent. The lower-tail bound follows from the first inequality by an argument similar to the proof of the Chernoff bound, applied to an auxiliary family of events.

== History ==
=== The chromatic number problem ===
Janson's inequality grew out of a problem about coloring random graphs. In 1975 Geoffrey Grimmett and Colin McDiarmid showed that, with high probability, the chromatic number of the random graph $G(n, 1/2)$ lies between roughly $n/(2\log_2 n)$ and $n/\log_2 n$, and they conjectured that the lower bound gives the correct asymptotic value. The conjecture remained open for more than a decade.

=== Poznań, 1987 ===
Participants of the 3rd International Seminar on Random Graphs and Probabilistic Methods in Combinatorics, June 27 – July 3, 1987, Adam Mickiewicz University – Poznań, Poland.

At the 3rd International Seminar on Random Graphs and Probabilistic Methods in Combinatorics, held at Adam Mickiewicz University in Poznań from 27 June to 3 July 1987, Béla Bollobás presented a proof of the conjecture: the chromatic number of $G(n, 1/2)$ is asymptotically $n/(2\log_2 n)$. The heart of the argument was to show that a random graph is extremely unlikely to have no large independent set, so unlikely that a union bound over all large sets of vertices can be applied. Bollobás proved this estimate with martingale methods based on Azuma's inequality. David Matula and Luděk Kučera gave a different proof, based on Matula's "expose-and-merge" method, which appeared in the same conference proceedings.

Both Janson and Spencer attended the meeting. Bollobás's lecture provided the motivation for Janson's work: by the end of the meeting, Janson had proved the first form of the inequality, using Laplace transforms. In a 2005 lecture at Uppsala University, Spencer headed the slide stating the inequality with the time of the discovery, "July 2nd, 1987 11:07 p.m.". Tomasz Łuczak independently found a related but less explicit bound for small subgraphs of random graphs, also using martingales.

=== Publication and new proofs ===
Svante Janson, Tomasz Łuczak and Andrzej Ruciński published the result for subgraph counts in random graphs, including the second form of the inequality under mild symmetry assumptions, in the proceedings of the conference. In 1989 Ravi Boppana and Joel Spencer gave a short elementary proof, modeled on the proof of the Lovász local lemma, which became the standard textbook argument. In 1990 Janson proved the general form of the second inequality, together with the lower-tail bound, in the first volume of the journal Random Structures & Algorithms; the next article in the same issue was W. C. S. Suen's related correlation inequality for general dependent events.

The inequalities, with their proofs and applications, became part of the standard treatment of the probabilistic method in combinatorics, where they form the basis of what Alon and Spencer call the "Poisson paradigm". Lutz Warnke, in a lecture on joint work with Janson, described the inequality as "widely used in combinatorial probability/random graph theory". Modern expositions often derive the estimate at the core of the chromatic number problem from Janson's inequality instead of martingales.

=== Later developments ===
Attention later turned to the limits of the method. Janson's inequality controls only the lower tail of the number of configurations, and in 2002 Janson and Ruciński titled their survey of the corresponding upper-tail problem "The infamous upper tail". For cliques in random graphs, the order of magnitude of the upper tail was determined independently by Sourav Chatterjee and by DeMarco and Kahn in 2012, and its exact asymptotics, for almost all sparse densities, by Matan Harel, Frank Mousset and Wojciech Samotij in 2022. On the lower-tail side, Oliver Riordan and Lutz Warnke showed in 2015 that the inequalities hold for arbitrary increasing events, and in 2016 Janson and Warnke showed that the lower-tail bound is asymptotically sharp when the dependence is small, closing a gap left open since 1990.

== Generalizations ==
- General increasing events. Oliver Riordan and Lutz Warnke showed in 2015 that the Janson inequalities hold when the events $A \subseteq \Gamma_p$ are replaced by arbitrary increasing events (up-sets) in a product probability space. Their proof needs only the positive correlation of the events, not positive correlation after conditioning on one of them.
- Exact asymptotics. Frank Mousset, Andreas Noever, Konstantinos Panagiotou and Wojciech Samotij refined the exponent $-\lambda + \Delta$ into an alternating sum of joint cumulants of small clusters of the indicator variables, obtaining matching upper and lower bounds that determine $\Pr(X = 0)$ asymptotically under natural conditions, not just up to the constant in the exponent. For triangles in $G(n,p)$ with $p = o(n^{-7/11})$, it recovers the following formula, which Stark and Wormald also obtained independently:
  $$\Pr(G(n,p) \text{ is triangle-free}) = \exp\left(-\frac{n^3p^3}{6} + \frac{n^4p^5}{4} - \frac{7n^5p^7}{12} + \frac{n^2p^3}{2} - \frac{3n^4p^6}{8} + \frac{27n^6p^9}{16} + o(1)\right).$$
- Suen's inequality. W. C. S. Suen proved a related inequality in 1990 that applies to sums of arbitrary indicator variables on any probability space, with the dependence controlled by a dependency graph. Janson later revisited and strengthened Suen's inequality.

== Applications ==
Many questions in probabilistic combinatorics reduce to estimating the probability that a random structure avoids every copy of some configuration: a random graph with no triangle, a random set of integers with no arithmetic progression, a random graph whose large vertex sets all contain an independent set. Janson's inequality is suited to such questions for three reasons. Its inputs, $\lambda$ and $\Delta$, are first- and second-moment quantities that can usually be computed directly. Its bounds are exponentially small, so they survive a union bound over exponentially many cases, as in the application to the chromatic number below. And when the dependence is weak, the bound is asymptotically sharp.

=== Subgraphs of random graphs ===
A basic example is the probability that the random graph $G(n,p)$ contains no triangle. Here $\Gamma$ is the set of edges of the complete graph $K_n$, each set in $S$ is the edge set of a triangle, $\lambda = \tbinom{n}{3}p^3$, and $\Delta = \tbinom{n}{4}\tbinom{4}{2}p^5$, since two distinct triangles that share an edge span four vertices. If $p = o(n^{-1/2})$ then $\Delta = o(\lambda)$, and the first inequality together with the Harris lower bound gives

$$\Pr(G(n,p) \text{ is triangle-free}) = e^{-(1+o(1))\lambda}.$$

For larger $p$ the second inequality gives an upper bound of the form $e^{-\Omega(n^2 p)}$, which matches, up to the constant in the exponent, the probability $(1-p)^{\binom{n}{2}}$ that the graph has no edges at all. The same method gives the probability that $G(n,p)$ contains no copy of any fixed graph, and the lower-tail bound shows that the number of copies is unlikely to fall much below its mean.

The inequality can also be used to find large structures. For example, when $p = 10^5 n^{-2/3}$, the first inequality shows that with probability tending to one, more than 99% of the vertices of $G(n,p)$ can be covered by vertex-disjoint triangles.

=== Chromatic number of random graphs ===
To show that the chromatic number of $G(n,1/2)$ is asymptotically $n/(2\log_2 n)$, one needs that, with very high probability, every moderately large set of vertices contains an independent set of size close to $2\log_2 n$; color classes can then be removed one at a time. The second Janson inequality, applied to the number of independent sets of a given size, shows that the probability that a random graph on $n$ vertices has no such independent set is at most $\exp(-n^{2-o(1)})$, small enough to apply a union bound over all candidate vertex sets. This gives a short proof of Bollobás's theorem.

=== Additive number theory ===
In additive number theory, the Erdős–Tetali theorem states that for every $h \ge 2$ there is an additive basis of order $h$ in which every sufficiently large integer has $\Theta(\log n)$ representations as a sum of $h$ elements. Its proof chooses the basis at random and needs the number of representations of each integer to be close to its mean; Janson's inequality was used to control the probability that this number is too small.

=== Computational complexity ===
Janson's inequality has been used in the study of pseudorandomness, for bounds on constant-depth circuits.

== See also ==
- Chernoff bound
- FKG inequality
- Lovász local lemma
- Concentration inequality
- Erdős–Rényi model
