= Minimum overlap problem =

In number theory and set theory, the minimum overlap problem is a problem proposed by Hungarian mathematician Paul Erdős in 1955.

== Formal statement of the problem ==
Let A = {a_{i}} and B = {b_{j}} be two complementary subsets, a splitting of the set of natural numbers {1, 2, …, 2n}, such that both have the same cardinality, namely n. Denote by M_{k} the number of solutions of the equation a_{i} − b_{j} = k, where k is an integer varying between −2n and 2n. M (n) is defined as:

$$M(n) := \min_{A,B} \max_k M_k. \,\!$$

The problem is to estimate M (n) when n is sufficiently large.

== History ==
This problem can be found amongst the problems proposed by Paul Erdős in combinatorial number theory, known by English speakers as the Minimum overlap problem. It was first formulated in the 1955 article Some remarks on number theory (in Hebrew) in Riveon Lematematica, and has become one of the classical problems described by Richard K. Guy in his book Unsolved problems in number theory.

== Partial results ==
Since it was first formulated, there has been continuous progress made in the calculation of lower bounds and upper bounds of M (n), with the following results:

=== Lower ===
Limit inferior	Author(s)	Year
$M(n) > n/4$	P. Erdős	1955
$M(n) > (1 - 2^{-1/2} )\, n$	P. Erdős, Scherk	1955
$M(n) > (4 - 6^{1/2})\, n/5$	S. Swierczkowski	1958
$M(n) > (4 - 15^{1/2})^{1/2}\, (n - 1)$	L. Moser	1966
$M(n) > (4 - 15^{1/2})^{1/2}\, n$	J. K. Haugland	1996
$M(n) > 0.379005 { \, } n$	E. P. White	2022

=== Upper ===
Limit superior	Author(s)	Year
$M(n) < (1+o(1)) n/2$	P. Erdős	1955
$M(n) < (1+o(1)) 2n/5$	T. S. Motzkin, K. E. Ralston and J. L. Selfridge	1956
$M(n) < (1+o(1)) 0.382002... n$	J. K. Haugland	1996
$M(n) < (1+o(1)) 0.380926... n$	J. K. Haugland	2016
$M(n) < (1+o(1)) 0.380924... n$	AlphaEvolve (Novikov et al.)	2025
$M(n) < (1+o(1)) 0.380876... n$	TTT-Discover (Yuksekgonul et al.)	2026
$M(n) < (1+o(1)) 0.380868... n$	SimpleTES (Ye et al.)	2026

J. K. Haugland showed that the limit of M (n) / n exists and that it is less than 0.385694. For his research, he was awarded a prize in a young scientists competition in 1993. In 1996, he improved the upper bound to 0.38201 using a result of Peter Swinnerton-Dyer. This has now been further improved to 0.38093. In 2022, the lower bound was shown to be at least 0.379005 by E. P. White. In 2025, the AI system AlphaEvolve improved the upper bound to 0.380924, and in 2026 TTT-Discover, another AI system, further improved it to 0.380876. Later on, an open-sourced AI system, SimpleTES, has improved it to 0.380868.

=== The first known values of M(n) ===
The values of M (n) for the first 15 positive integers are the following:

$n\,\!$	1	2	3	4	5	6	7	8	9	10	11	12	13	14	15	...
$M(n)\,\!$	1	1	2	2	3	3	3	4	4	5	5	5	6	6	6	...

It is just the Law of Small Numbers that it is $\textstyle \lfloor 5(n+3)/13 \rfloor$
