= Erdos Group =

Erdos Group (also Inner Mongolia Erdos Group Co., Ltd.) is a Chinese conglomerate with interests in cashmere, energy, and metallurgy.

In 2024, The Erdos Group, ranked 51st in China's 500 Most Valuable Brands 2024 list with a brand value of 180.97 billion RMB (US$24.83 billion).
