= György Marx =

Hungarian physicist (1927–2002)

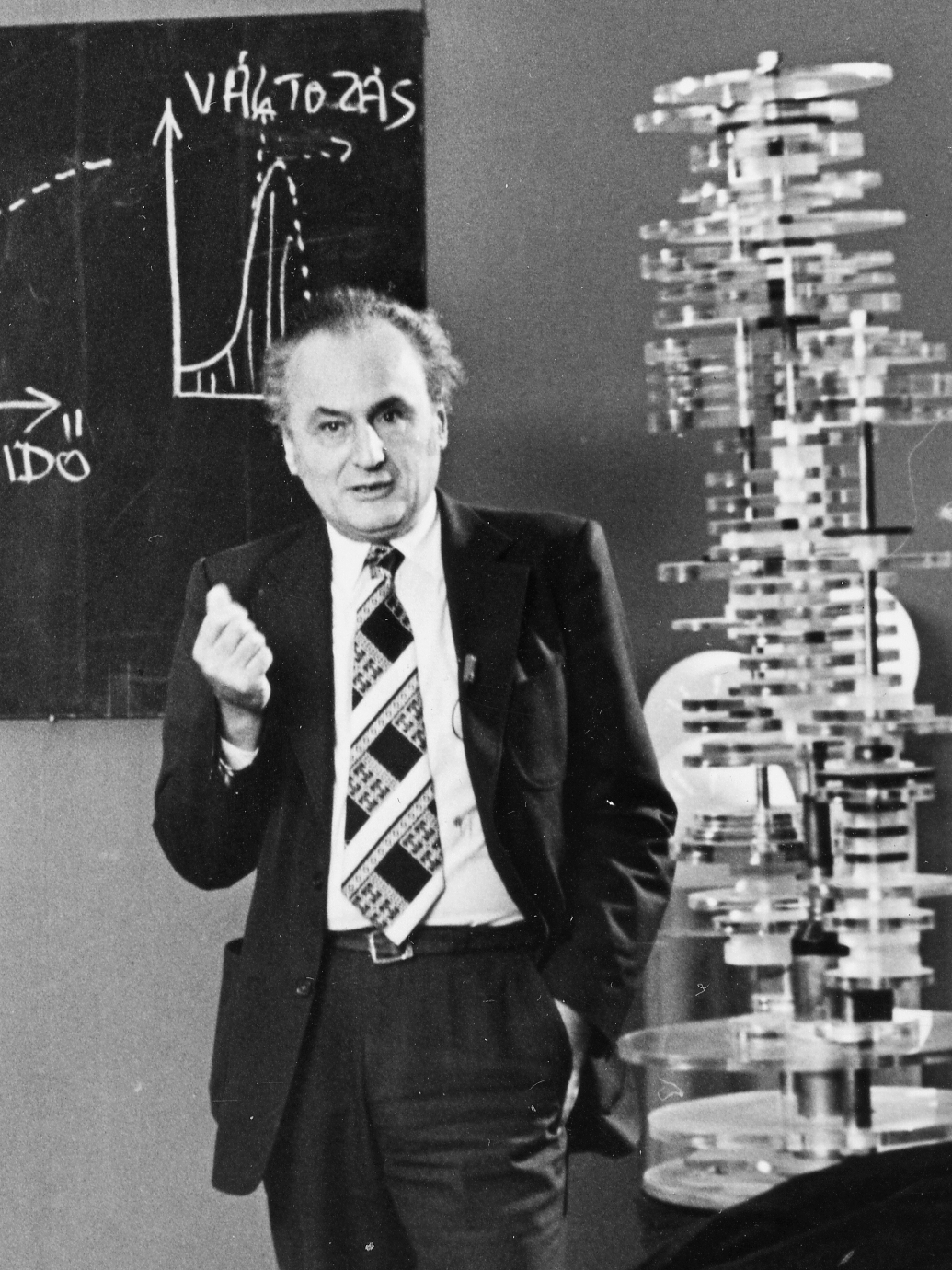
- Marx holding a lecture in 1981
- Born: 25 May 1927; Budapest, Kingdom of Hungary
- Died: 2 December 2002 (aged 75); Budapest, Hungary
- Education: University of Budapest
- Known for: Lepton numbers; Law of lepton flavor conservation
- Awards: Hungarian Order of Merit (by the President of Hungary; 1997); Academical Prize (by the Hungarian Academy of Sciences; 1963); Kossuth Prize (1953); Bragg Medal (by the Institute of Physics; 2001)
- Scientific career
- Fields: Nuclear physics Astrophysics; Science history
- Institutions: University of Budapest (theoretical physics) (1948–1970) (nuclear physics) (1970–1998)

György Marx (25 May 1927 – 2 December 2002) was a Hungarian physicist, astrophysicist, science historian and professor. He discovered the lepton numbers and established the law of lepton flavor conservation.

== Life ==
He was the first non-British laureate of the Bragg Medal of the Institute of Physics, in 2001. He received it for his "outstanding contributions to physics education".

Marx authored a book about several of the 20th century's exceptional Hungarian scientists, The Voice of the Martians.

== Death ==
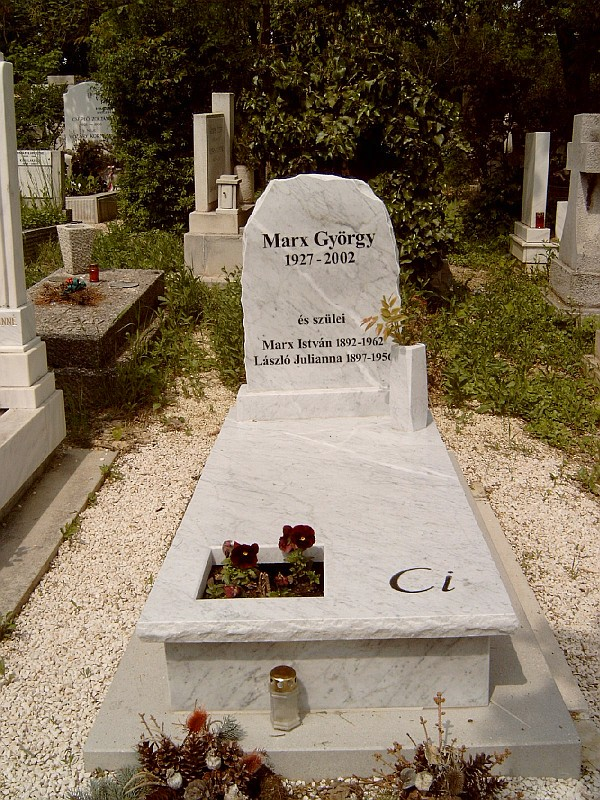
The tomb of György Marx and his parents in the Farkasréti Cemetery (30/2-1-3.)

Marx died on December 2, 2002, in Budapest after a serious illness. On December 18 he was buried at the Farkasréti Cemetery with Reformed ceremony in the presence of his family, friends, disciples, colleagues and fellow scientists. Szilveszter E. Vizi, neuroscientist and president of the Hungarian Academy of Sciences said the prayer for him.
