= Paul Erdős =

Hungarian mathematician (1913–1996)

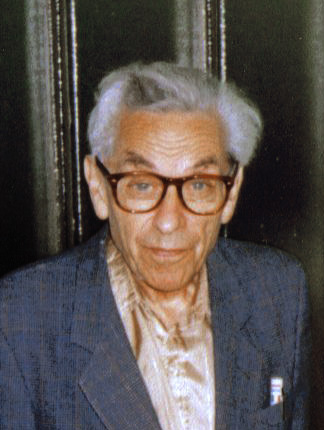
- Erdős in 1992
- Born: Erdős Pál; 26 March 1913; Budapest, Austria-Hungary
- Died: 20 September 1996 (aged 83); Warsaw, Poland
- Citizenship: Hungary
- Education: Royal Hungarian Pázmány Péter University
- Known for: Large number of results and conjectures and coauthors; Namesakes
- Awards: Wolf Prize (1983/84); AMS Cole Prize (1951)
- Scientific career
- Fields: Mathematics
- Workplaces: Victoria University of Manchester; Princeton University; Purdue University; University of Pennsylvania; University of Notre Dame; Stanford University; Syracuse University; Hebrew University of Jerusalem; Technion – Israel Institute of Technology
- Doctoral advisor: Lipót Fejér
- Doctoral students: Géza Fodor; Joseph Kruskal; Béla Bollobás

Paul Erdős (Hungarian: Erdős Pál [ˈɛrdøːʃ ˈpaːl]; 26 March 1913 – 20 September 1996) was a Hungarian mathematician. He is regarded as one of the most prolific mathematicians and producers of mathematical conjectures in history. Erdős proposed and pursued problems in discrete mathematics, graph theory, number theory, mathematical analysis, approximation theory, set theory, and probability theory. Much of his work centered on discrete mathematics, cracking many previously unsolved problems in the field. He championed and contributed to Ramsey theory, which studies the conditions in which order necessarily appears. Overall, his work leaned towards solving previously open problems, rather than developing or exploring new areas of mathematics.

He taught at various universities in the United States and Israel. Erdős's output was prolific; he published around 1,500 mathematical papers during his lifetime, many being collaborations with other mathematicians, making him arguably the most prolific mathematician in history. (Note: According to Jack Murtagh (2024), "some contend that 18th-century [Swiss] mathematician Leonhard Euler was the most prolific of all time. Indeed, Euler produced more pages of math, whereas Erdős produced more papers".) This prompted the creation of the Erdős number, the number of steps in the shortest path between a mathematician and Erdős in terms of co-authorships.

He was known both for his social practice of mathematics, working with more than 500 collaborators, and for his eccentric lifestyle. He firmly believed mathematics to be a social activity, living a nomadic lifestyle with the sole purpose of writing mathematical papers with other mathematicians. He devoted his waking hours to mathematics, even into his later years; he died at a mathematics conference in Warsaw in 1996.

== Early life and education ==
Paul Erdős was born on 26 March 1913, in Budapest, Austria-Hungary, the only surviving child of Anna (née Wilhelm) and Lajos Erdős (né Engländer). His two sisters, aged three and five, both died of scarlet fever a few days before he was born. He was born to a well-to-do Hungarian-Jewish family, both of his parents worked as high school mathematics teachers. His fascination with mathematics developed early. He was raised partly by a German governess because his father was held captive in Siberia as an Austro-Hungarian prisoner of war during 1914–1920, causing his mother to have to work long hours to support their household. His father had taught himself English while in captivity but mispronounced many words. When Lajos later taught his son to speak English, Paul learned his father's pronunciation, which he continued to use for the rest of his life.

He taught himself to read through mathematics texts that his parents left around in their home. By the age of five, given a person's age, he could calculate in his head how many seconds they had lived. Due to his sisters' deaths, he had a close relationship with his mother, with the two of them reportedly sharing the same bed until he left for college.

When he was 16, his father introduced him to two subjects that would become lifetime favourites—infinite series and set theory. In high school, Erdős became an ardent solver of the problems that appeared each month in KöMaL, the "Mathematical and Physical Journal for Secondary Schools".

Erdős began studying at the University of Budapest when he was 17 after winning a national examination. At the time, admission of Jews to Hungarian universities was severely restricted under the numerus clausus.

During 1933, Erdős and several other students, including George Szekeres, Esther Klein (later Szekeres), her lifelong friend Márta Wachsberger (later Svéd), and George Svéd, met frequently, often at the Anonymous statue in City Park, to discuss mathematics. Klein proposed a problem, offering her proof, about which Szekeres and Erdős wrote a paper that generalised the result in 1935. Erdős dubbed the original problem the "Happy ending problem" because it resulted in the marriage of George and Esther Szekeres.

By the time he was 20, Erdős had found a proof for Bertrand's postulate. In 1934, at the age of 21, he was awarded a doctorate in mathematics. Erdős's thesis advisor was Lipót Fejér, who was also the thesis advisor for John von Neumann, George Pólya, and Pál Turán.

== Career ==
In 1934, Erdős took up a post-doctoral fellowship at Victoria University of Manchester in Manchester, England, where he met G. H. Hardy and Stanisław Ulam.

Because he was Jewish, Erdős faced increasing antisemitic persecution in Hungary, and he left the country in 1938, relocating to the United States. In 1938, he accepted his first American position as a scholarship holder at the Institute for Advanced Study, Princeton, New Jersey, for the next ten years. Despite outstanding papers with Mark Kac and Aurel Wintner on probabilistic number theory, Pál Turán in approximation theory, and Witold Hurewicz on dimension theory, his fellowship was not continued, and Erdős was forced to take positions as a wandering scholar at University of Pennsylvania, Notre Dame, Purdue, Stanford, and Syracuse. He would not stay long in one place, instead traveling among mathematical institutions until his death.

Described by his biographer, Paul Hoffman, as "probably the most eccentric mathematician in the world", Erdős spent most of his adult life living out of a suitcase. Time magazine called him "The Oddball's Oddball". Except for some years in the 1950s, when he was not allowed to enter the United States based on the accusation that he was a Communist sympathizer, his life was a continuous series of going from one meeting or seminar to another. During his visits, Erdős expected his hosts to lodge him, feed him, and do his laundry, along with anything else he needed, as well as arrange for him to get to his next destination.

In 1941, Erdős and two others would be arrested by authorities for looking around a secret radio tower, with Erdős reportedly telling police that rather than noticing the signs against trespassing, "I was thinking about mathematical theorems." The FBI would maintain surveillance and a file on Erdős into the 1970s, but never found anything incriminating.

In 1943, Erdős began a part-time appointment at Purdue University. In the same year, Stanisław Ulam invited Erdős to work on the Manhattan Project in Los Alamos, New Mexico, with him, along with other mathematicians and physicists. However, Erdős expressed a desire to return to Hungary after the war.

Near the end of 1948 Erdős was able to return to Hungary for a visit, where he was reunited with his surviving family and friends. For the next three years he traveled frequently between England and the United States, before accepting a temporary post at the University of Notre Dame, Indiana, in 1952. The post gave him complete freedom to travel to do joint research whenever he wanted, but, despite encouragement from the university and his friends, he would not accept the offer on a permanent basis. Hungary at the time was under the Warsaw Pact with the Soviet Union. Although Hungary limited the freedom of its own citizens to enter and exit the country, in 1956 it gave Erdős the exclusive privilege of being allowed to enter and exit the country as he pleased.

As a result of the Red Scare and McCarthyism, in 1954, the United States Immigration and Naturalization Service denied Erdős, a Hungarian citizen, a re-entry visa into the United States. The official reasons were the fact that he had corresponded with a Chinese mathematician who had subsequently returned from the United States to China, and also Erdős's 1941 FBI record. He requested reconsideration from the U.S. Immigration Services at periodic intervals during the early 1960s, and visa was finally granted in November 1963. During this period he spent around 10 years in Israel. He was given a position for three months at the Hebrew University of Jerusalem, and then a "permanent visiting professor" position at the Technion in Haifa.

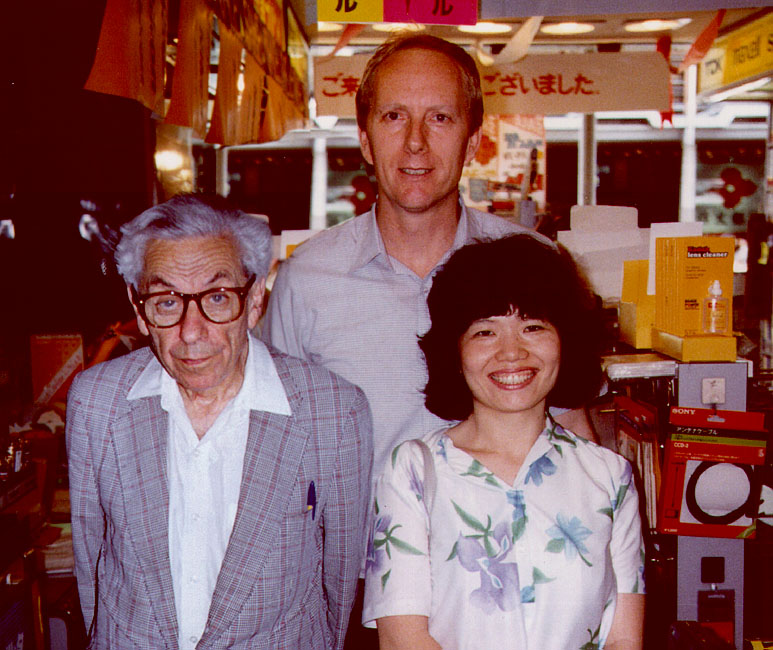
Counter-clockwise from left: Erdős, Fan Chung, and her husband Ronald Graham, Japan 1986

In 1963, the United States Immigration and Naturalization Service granted Erdős a visa, and he resumed teaching at and traveling to American institutions. Ten years later, in 1973, the 60-year-old Erdős voluntarily left Hungary.

In 1985, he visited two universities in Adelaide, South Australia, Flinders University and the University of Adelaide. At the latter, he met budding mathematician Terence Tao, then 10 years old. Erdős reportedly enjoyed working with children. His trip to Australia was instigated by longtime friend and collaborator, Hungarian mathematician George Szekeres.

=== Mathematical work ===
Erdős was one of the most prolific mathematicians and producers of mathematical conjectures in history, if not the most. He was compared with Leonard Euler for the sheer quantity of his writings. Erdős wrote around 1,525 mathematical articles in his lifetime—a figure that remains unsurpassed as of 2023—mostly with co-authors. He was a faithful believer and partaker of the social practice of mathematics, working with 511 different collaborators in his lifetime.

Most of his work centered on discrete mathematics, graph theory, number theory, mathematical analysis, approximation theory, set theory, and probability theory.

In his mathematical style, Erdős was much more of a "problem solver" than a "theory developer" (see "The Two Cultures of Mathematics" by Timothy Gowers for an in-depth discussion of the two styles, and why problem solvers are perhaps less appreciated). Joel Spencer states that "his place in the 20th-century mathematical pantheon is a matter of some controversy because he resolutely concentrated on particular theorems and conjectures throughout his illustrious career." Erdős never won the Fields Medal (the highest mathematical prize available during his lifetime), nor did he coauthor a paper with anyone who did, a pattern that extends to other prizes. He did win the 1983/84 Wolf Prize, "for his numerous contributions to number theory, combinatorics, probability, set theory and mathematical analysis, and for personally stimulating mathematicians the world over".

Of his contributions, the development of Ramsey theory and the application of the probabilistic method especially stand out. Extremal combinatorics owes to him a whole approach, derived in part from the tradition of analytic number theory. Erdős found a proof for Bertrand's postulate which proved to be far neater than Chebyshev's original one. He also discovered the first elementary proof for the prime number theorem, along with Atle Selberg. However, the circumstances leading up to the proofs, as well as publication disagreements, led to a bitter dispute between Erdős and Selberg. Erdős also contributed to fields in which he had little real interest, such as topology, where he is credited as the first person to give an example of a totally disconnected topological space that is not zero-dimensional, the Erdős space.

=== Erdős's problems ===
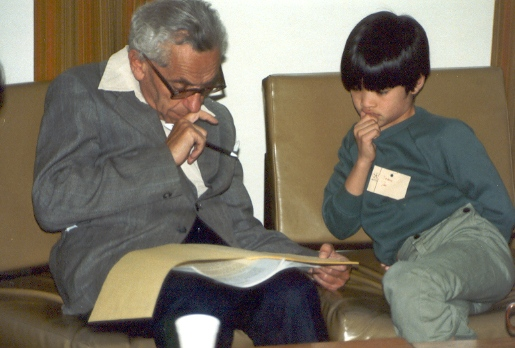
Erdős explains a problem to Terence Tao, who was 10 years old at the time (1985).

Erdős had a reputation for posing new problems as well as solving existing ones: Ernst Strauss called him "the absolute monarch of problem posers". Throughout his career, Erdős would offer payments for solutions to unresolved problems. These ranged from $25 for problems that he felt were just out of the reach of the current mathematical thinking (both his and others) up to $10,000 for problems that were both difficult to attack and mathematically significant. Some of these problems have since been solved, including the most lucrative – Erdős's conjecture on prime gaps was solved in 2014, and the $10,000 paid.

There are thought to be at least a thousand remaining unsolved problems, though there is no official or comprehensive list. The offers remained active despite Erdős's death; Ronald Graham was the (informal) administrator of solutions, and a solver could receive either an original check signed by Erdős before his death (for memento only, cannot be cashed) or a cashable check from Graham. Graham's role as administrator was later taken on by the Combinatorics Foundation, currently chaired by Steve Butler. British mathematician Thomas Bloom started a website dedicated to Erdős's problems in 2024. By 2026, it listed over 1,200 problems.

In October 2025, OpenAI executives claimed that GPT-5 had solved ten open Erdős problems. Bloom called the claim "a dramatic misrepresentation", as the model had located existing solutions in the literature. In January 2026, a problem on the site was solved by AI with, according to Terence Tao, little human intervention, and in May 2026 OpenAI announced that an internal model had disproved Erdős's 1946 unit distance conjecture, a result subsequently verified and strengthened by human mathematicians.

Perhaps the most mathematically notable of these problems is the Erdős conjecture on arithmetic progressions:

If the sum of the reciprocals of a sequence of integers diverges, then the sequence contains arithmetic progressions of arbitrary length.

If true, it would solve several other open problems in number theory, although one main implication of the conjecture, that the prime numbers contain arbitrarily long arithmetic progressions, has since been proved independently as the Green–Tao theorem. The payment for the solution of the problem is currently worth US$5,000.. In 2026, OpenAI claimed to have proved this conjecture.

The most familiar problem with an Erdős prize is likely the Collatz conjecture, also called the 3N + 1 problem. Erdős offered $500 for a solution.

=== Collaborators ===
Erdős's most frequent collaborators include Hungarian mathematicians András Sárközy (62 papers) and András Hajnal (56 papers), and American mathematician Ralph Faudree (50 papers). Other frequent collaborators were the following:

- Richard Schelp (42 papers)
- Cecil C. Rousseau (35 papers)
- Vera T. Sós (35 papers)
- Alfréd Rényi (32 papers)
- Pál Turán (30 papers)
- Endre Szemerédi (29 papers)
- Ron Graham (28 papers)
- Stefan Burr (27 papers)
- Carl Pomerance (23 papers)
- Joel Spencer (23 papers)
- János Pach (21 papers)
- Miklós Simonovits (21 papers)
- Ernst G. Straus (20 papers)
- Melvyn B. Nathanson (19 papers)
- Jean-Louis Nicolas (19 papers)
- Richard Rado (18 papers)
- Béla Bollobás (18 papers)
- Eric Charles Milner (15 papers)
- András Gyárfás (15 papers)
- John Selfridge (14 papers)
- Fan Chung (14 papers)
- Richard R. Hall (14 papers)
- George Piranian (14 papers)
- István Joó (12 papers)
- Zsolt Tuza (12 papers)
- A. R. Reddy (11 papers)
- Vojtěch Rödl (11 papers)
- Pál Révész (10 papers)
- Zoltán Füredi (10 papers)

For other co-authors of Erdős, see the list of people with Erdős number 1 in List of people by Erdős number.

=== Doctoral students ===
Erdős's doctoral students included:

- Joseph Kruskal
- Béla Bollobás
- Géza Fodor

== Recognition and honours ==
Erdős won many prizes, including the Wolf Prize in 1983, worth $50,000. However, his lifestyle needed little money and he gave away "most of the money he earned from lecturing at mathematics conferences, donating it to help students or as prizes for solving problems he had posed".

During the last decades of his life, he received at least 15 honorary doctorates. He became a member of the scientific academies of eight countries, including the U.S. National Academy of Sciences and the UK Royal Society. Shortly before his death, he renounced his honorary degree from the University of Waterloo over what he considered to be unfair treatment of colleague Adrian Bondy.

He became a foreign member of the Royal Netherlands Academy of Arts and Sciences in 1977.

Other awards and honors included:

- AMS Cole Prize in Number Theory 1951
- British Mathematical Colloquium plenary speaker 1957
- London Mathematical Society honorary member 1973
- Speaker at International Congresses of Mathematicians 1983

=== Erdős number ===
Because of his prolific output, his friends created the Erdős number as a tribute. An Erdős number describes a person's degree of separation from Erdős himself, based on their collaboration with him, or with another who has their own Erdős number. Erdős alone was assigned the Erdős number of 0 (for being himself), while his immediate collaborators could claim an Erdős number of 1, their collaborators have Erdős number at most 2, and so on. Approximately 200,000 mathematicians have an assigned Erdős number, and some have estimated that 90 percent of the world's active mathematicians have an Erdős number smaller than 8 (not surprising in light of the small-world phenomenon). Due to collaborations with mathematicians, many scientists in fields such as physics, engineering, biology, and economics also have Erdős numbers.

Several studies have shown that leading mathematicians tend to have particularly low Erdős numbers. For example, the median Erdős number of Fields Medalists is 3, whereas the roughly 268,000 mathematicians with a known Erdős number have a median value of 5. As of 2015, approximately 11,000 mathematicians have an Erdős number of 2 or lower. Collaboration distances will necessarily increase over long time scales, as mathematicians with low Erdős numbers die and become unavailable for collaboration. The American Mathematical Society provides a free online tool to determine the Erdős number of every mathematical author listed in the Mathematical Reviews catalogue.

The Erdős number was most likely first defined by Casper Goffman, an analyst whose own Erdős number is 2; Goffman co-authored with mathematician Richard B. Darst, who co-authored with Erdős. Goffman published his observations about Erdős's prolific collaboration in a 1969 article titled "And what is your Erdős number?"

Jerry Grossman has written that it could be argued that Baseball Hall of Famer Hank Aaron can be considered to have an Erdős number of 1, because they both autographed the same baseball for Carl Pomerance when Emory University awarded them honorary degrees on the same day. Erdős numbers have also been proposed for an infant, a horse, and several actors.

== Personal life ==
Another roof, another proof.

— Paul Erdős

Many members of Erdős's family, including two of his aunts, two of his uncles, and his father, were murdered during the Holocaust in Budapest during World War II. His mother was the only one that survived. He was living in America and working at the Institute for Advanced Study in Princeton at the time. However, his fellowship at Princeton only got extended by 6 months rather than the expected year due to Erdős not conforming to the standards of the place; they found him "uncouth and unconventional".

Erdős never married and had no children.

Erdős's name contains the Hungarian letter "ő" ("o" with double acute accent), but is often written as Erdos or Erdös either "by mistake or out of typographical necessity".

His colleague Alfréd Rényi said, "A mathematician is a machine for turning coffee into theorems", and Erdős drank copious quantities; this quotation is often attributed incorrectly to Erdős, but Erdős ascribed it to Rényi. After his mother's death in 1971 he started taking antidepressants and amphetamines, despite the concern of his friends, one of whom (Ron Graham) bet him $500 that he could not stop taking them for a month. Erdős won the bet but complained that it impacted his performance: "You've showed me I'm not an addict. But I didn't get any work done. I'd get up in the morning and stare at a blank piece of paper. I'd have no ideas, just like an ordinary person. You've set mathematics back a month." After he won the bet, he promptly resumed his use of Ritalin and Benzedrine.

He had his own distinctive vocabulary, although as an agnostic atheist, he spoke of "The Book", a visualization of a book in which God had written down the best and most elegant proofs for mathematical theorems. He used "The Book" expression since at least the late 1970s, and lecturing in 1985 he said, "You don't have to believe in God, but you should believe in The Book." He doubted the existence of God. He playfully nicknamed him the SF (for "Supreme Fascist"), accusing him of hiding his socks and Hungarian passports, and of keeping the most elegant mathematical proofs to himself. When he saw a particularly beautiful mathematical proof he would exclaim, "This one's from The Book!" This later inspired a book titled Proofs from the Book.

Other distinctive elements of Erdős's vocabulary include:

- Children were referred to as "epsilons", because in mathematics, particularly calculus, an arbitrarily small positive quantity is commonly denoted by the Greek letter (ε).
- Women were "bosses" who "captured" men as "slaves" by marrying them. Divorced men were "liberated".
- People who stopped doing mathematics had "died", while people who died had "left".
- Alcoholic drinks were "poison".
- Music, except classical music, was "noise".
- To be considered a hack was to be a "Newton".
- To give a mathematical lecture was "to preach".
- Mathematical lectures were "sermons".
- To give an oral exam to students was "to torture" them.

He gave nicknames to many countries, examples being: the U.S. was "samland" (after Uncle Sam) and the Soviet Union was "joedom" (after Joseph Stalin). He claimed that Hindi was the best language, because words for old age (bud̩d̩hā) and stupidity (buddhū) sounded almost the same.

=== Signature ===
Erdős signed his name "Paul Erdos P.G.O.M." When he became 60, he added "L.D.", at 65 "A.D.", at 70 "L.D." (again), and at 75 "C.D."

- P.G.O.M. represented "Poor Great Old Man"
- The first L.D. represented "Living Dead"
- A.D. represented "Archaeological Discovery"
- The second L.D. represented "Legally Dead"
- C.D. represented "Counts Dead"

== Death and legacy ==
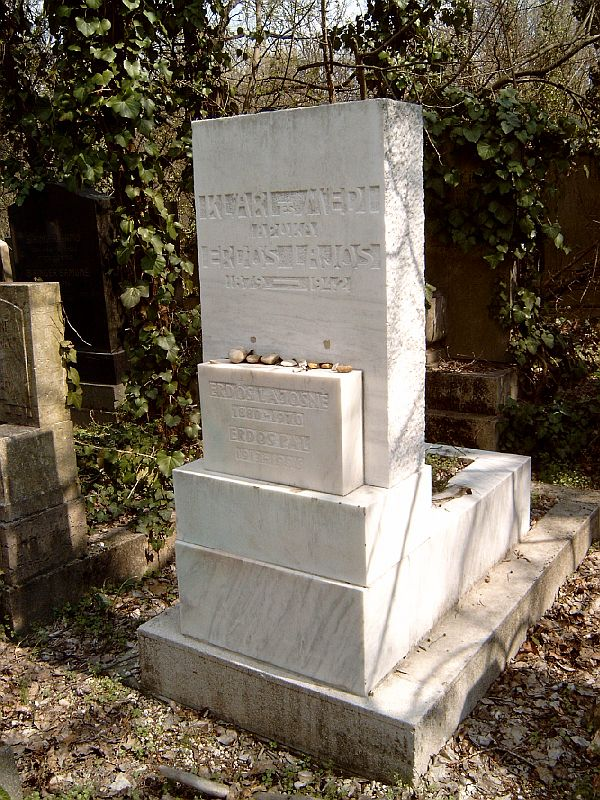
Grave of Erdős, Kozma Street Cemetery, Budapest

On 20 September 1996, at the age of 83, he had a heart attack and died while attending a conference in Warsaw. These circumstances were close to the way he wanted to die. He once said,

I want to be giving a lecture, finishing up an important proof on the blackboard, when someone in the audience shouts out, 'What about the general case?'. I'll turn to the audience and smile, 'I'll leave that to the next generation,' and then I'll keel over.

He is buried next to his mother and father in the Jewish Kozma Street Cemetery in Budapest. For his epitaph, he suggested "I've finally stopped getting dumber." (Hungarian: "Végre nem butulok tovább").

=== Paul Erdős Award ===
The Paul Erdős Award was established by the World Federation of National Mathematics Competitions in 1996, and is awarded annually.

=== Books and films ===
Erdős is the subject of at least three books: two biographies (Hoffman's The Man Who Loved Only Numbers and Schechter's My Brain is Open, both published in 1998) and a 2013 children's picture book by Deborah Heiligman (The Boy Who Loved Math: The Improbable Life of Paul Erdős).

He is also the subject of George Csicsery's 1993 biographical documentary film N is a Number: A Portrait of Paul Erdős.

Australian author Miriam Sved, granddaughter of Márta and George Svéd, published the novel A Universe of Sufficient Size in 2019. It tells the story of a group of Jewish mathematicians in Hungary who flee the country. While the story is fictional, several characters are loosely based on people in Svéd's circle, in particular Esther and George Szekeres, as well as Erdős.

=== Astronomy ===
In 2021 the minor planet (asteroid) 405571 (temporarily designated 2005 QE87) was formally named "Erdőspál" to commemorate Erdős, with the citation describing him as "a Hungarian mathematician, much of whose work centered around discrete mathematics. His work leaned towards solving previously open problems, rather than developing or exploring new areas of mathematics." The naming was proposed by "K. Sárneczky, Z. Kuli" (Kuli being the asteroid's discoverer).

=== Arachnology ===
In 2025 British arachnologists Danniella Sherwood and R. C. Gallon described Heterothele erdosi Sherwood & Gallon, 2025, a new species of tarantula from Nigeria, named in honour of Erdős.

== See also ==
- List of topics named after Paul Erdős – including conjectures, numbers, prizes, and theorems
- Box-making game
- Covering system – Collection of residue classes
- Dimension (graph theory) – Integer associated with a graph
- Even circuit theorem
- Friendship graph – Graph of triangles with a shared vertex
- Hungarian mathematics – History and development of mathematics in Hungary
- Minimum overlap problem
- Probabilistic method – Nonconstructive method for mathematical proofs
- Probabilistic number theory – Subfield of number theory
- The Martians (scientists) – Group of prominent Hungarian scientists
- Monty Hall problem - He rebutted Savant's answer but ultimately admitted that he had been wrong.
