= Zero-sum Ramsey theory =

Study of structures where a subset must sum to zero

In mathematics, zero-sum Ramsey theory or zero-sum theory is a branch of combinatorics. It deals with problems of the following kind: given a combinatorial structure whose elements are assigned different weights (usually elements from an Abelian group $A$), one seeks for conditions that guarantee the existence of certain substructure whose weights of its elements sum up to zero (in $A$). It combines tools from number theory, algebra, linear algebra, graph theory, discrete analysis, and other branches of mathematics.

The classic result in this area is the 1961 theorem of Paul Erdős, Abraham Ginzburg, and Abraham Ziv: for any $2m - 1$ elements of $\mathbb{Z}_m$, there is a subset of size $m$ that sums to zero. (This bound is tight, as a sequence of $m - 1$ zeroes and $m - 1$ ones cannot have any subset of size $m$ summing to zero.) There are known proofs of this result using the Cauchy-Davenport theorem, Fermat's little theorem, or the Chevalley–Warning theorem.

Generalizing this result, one can define for any abelian group G the minimum quantity $EGZ(G)$ of elements of G such that there must be a subsequence of $o(G)$ elements (where $o(G)$ is the order of the group) which adds to zero. It is known that $EGZ(G)\leq 2o(G) - 1$, and that this bound is strict if and only if $G = \mathbb{Z}_m$.

== See also ==
- Zero-sum problem
