= Arie Bialostocki =

Israeli-American mathematician and physics professor

- אריה ביאלוסטוקי
- Education: Tel Aviv University
- Known for: Erdős–Ginzburg–Ziv theorem, Zero-sum Ramsey theory
- Scientific career
- Fields: Discrete Mathematics, Finite Groups
- Workplaces: University of Idaho
- Doctoral advisor: Marcel Herzog

Arie Bialostocki
- Education: Tel-Aviv University, Israel
- Occupation: Mathematician
- Employer: University of Idaho
- Known for: Zero-Sum Ramsey theory

Arie Bialostocki (Hebrew: אריה ביאלוסטוקי) is an Israeli American mathematician with expertise and contributions in discrete mathematics and finite groups.

== Education and career ==
Arie received his BSc, MSc, and PhD (1984) from Tel-Aviv University in Israel. His dissertation was done under the supervision of Marcel Herzog. After a year of postdoc at the University of Calgary in Canada, he took a faculty position at the University of Idaho, becoming a full professor in 1992. Arie retired from his position at the University of Idaho in 2011. He maintained strong international connections, corresponding with mathematicians from India, Kashmir, Iran, Jordan, and China. His Erdős number is 1. He has supervised seven PhD students and numerous undergraduate students who enjoyed his colorful anecdotes and advice. He organized a summer Research Experience for Undergraduates (REU) program at the University of Idaho from 1999 to 2003 and maintained contact with many of the students who participated, some of whom went on to pursue their own careers in research.

== Mathematics research ==
Arie has published more than 50 publications. Some of Bialostocki's contributions include:

- Bialostocki redefined a $B$-injector in a finite group G to be any maximal nilpotent subgroup $B$ of $G$ satisfying $d_2(B)=d_2(G)$, where $d_2(X)$ is the largest cardinality of a subgroup of $G$ which is nilpotent of class at most $2$. Using his definition, it was proved by several authors that in many non-solvable groups the nilpotent injectors form a unique conjugacy class.
- Bialostocki contributed to the generalization of the Erdős-Ginzburg-Ziv theorem (also known as the EGZ theorem). He conjectured: if $A=(a_1,a_2,\ldots,a_n)$ is a sequence of elements of ${\mathbb Z}_m$, then $A$ contains at least ${\lfloor{n/2}\rfloor \choose {m}}+{\lceil{n/2}\rceil \choose{m}}$ zero sums of length $m$. The EGZ theorem is a special case where $n=2m-1$. The conjecture was partially confirmed by Kisin, Füredi and Kleitman, and Grynkiewicz.
- Bialostocki introduced the EGZ polynomials and contributed to generalize the EGZ theorem for higher degree polynomials. The EGZ theorem is associated with the first degree elementary polynomial.
- Bialostocki and Dierker introduced the relationship of EGZ theorem to Ramsey Theory on graphs.
- Bialostocki, Erdős, and Lefmann introduced the relationship of EGZ theorem to Ramsey Theory on the positive integers.
- In Jakobs and Jungnickel's book "Einführung in die Kombinatorik", Bialostocki and Dierker are attributed for introducing Zero-sum Ramsey theory. In Landman and Robertson's book "Ramsey Theory on the Integers", the number $b(m, k; r)$ is defined in honor of Bialostocki's contributions to the Zero-sum Ramsey theory.
- Bialostocki, Dierker, and Voxman suggested a conjecture offering a modular strengthening of the Erdős–Szekeres theorem proving that the number of points in the interior of the polygon is divisible by $k$, provided that total number of points $n\geqslant k+2$. Károlyi, Pach and Tóth made further progress toward the proof of the conjecture.
- In recreational mathematics, Arie's paper on application of elementary group theory to Peg Solitaire is a suggested reading in Joseph Gallian's book on Abstract Algebra.
