= Barycentric-sum problem =

Combinatorial number theory deals with number theoretic problems which involve combinatorial ideas in their formulations or solutions. Paul Erdős is the main founder of this branch of number theory. Typical topics include covering system, zero-sum problems, various restricted sumsets, and arithmetic progressions in a set of integers. Algebraic or analytic methods are powerful in this field.

In combinatorial number theory, the barycentric-sum problems are questions that can be answered using combinatorial techniques. The context of barycentric-sum problems are the barycentric sequences.

== Example ==
Let $Z_n$ be the cyclic group of integers modulo n. Let S be a sequence of elements of $Z_n$, where the repetition of elements is allowed. Let $|S|$ be the length of S. A sequence $S \subseteq Z_n$ with $|S| \geq 2$ is barycentric or has a barycentric-sum if it contains one element $a_j$ such that $\sum\limits_ {a_i \in S} a_i=|S|a_j$.

Informally, if $S$ contains one element $a_j$, which is the ”average” of its terms. A barycentric sequence of length $t$ is called a t-barycentric sequence. Moreover, when S is a set, the term barycentric set is used instead of barycentric sequence. For example, the set {0,1,2,3,4} $\subseteq Z_8$ is 5-barycentric with barycenter 2, however the set {0,2,3,4,5} $\subseteq Z_8$ is not 5-barycentric. The barycentric-sum problem consist in finding the smallest integer t such that any sequence of length t contains a k-barycentric sequence for some given k. The study of the existence of such t related with k and the study of barycentric constants are part of the barycentric-sum problems. It has been introduced by Ordaz, inspired in a theorem of Hamidoune: every sequence of length $n + k - 1$ in $Z_n$ contains a k-barycentric sequence. Notice that a k-barycentric sequence in $Z_n$, with k a multiple of n, is a sequence with zero-sum. The zero-sum problem on sequences started in 1961 with the Erdős, Ginzburg and Ziv theorem: every sequence of length $2n-1$ in an abelian group of order n, contains an n-subsequence with zero-sum.

Barycentric-sum problems have been defined in general for finite abelian groups. However, most of the main results obtained up to now are in $Z_n$.

The barycentric constants introduced by Ordaz are: k-barycentric Olson constant, k-barycentric Davenport constant, barycentric Davenport constant, generalized barycentric Davenport constant, constrained barycentric Davenport constant. This constants are related to the Davenport constant i.e. the smallest integer t such that any t-sequence contains a subsequence with zero-sum. Moreover, related to the classical Ramsey numbers, the barycentric Ramsey numbers are introduced. An overview of the results computed manually or automatically are presented. The implemented algorithms are written in C.
