= Daniel Schueftan =

Israeli academic (born 1943)

Dan Schueftan (Hebrew: דן שיפטן; also Dan Shiftan; born 1943) is an Israeli academic and chairman of the National Security Studies Center at the University of Haifa. He also serves as a senior lecturer at Haifa University's School of Political Sciences. He has taught at the Israel Defense Force's National Security College and the IDF's Command and Staff College.

== Career, views ==
Dan Schueftan was an advisor to Israel's National Security Council and to former prime ministers Yitzhak Rabin and Ariel Sharon.

He has served as a consultant to Israeli decision-makers and the top echelon of Israel's foreign policy and defense establishments, also briefing European and American political leaders and senior officers. He is the author of several books on contemporary Middle Eastern history.

Schueftan is credited with having advanced the concept of "unilateral disengagement", or "unilateral separation", as articulated in his 1999 book, Disengagement: Israel and the Palestinian Entity. The book is cited as having formed the basis for the concept of separation from the Palestinians.

In Schueftan's view, Israel's unilateral disengagement from Gaza is a first step in a wider historical process. He told The Jerusalem Report in September 2005 that: "I can even pin dates on it. In 2007 or 2008 we will have another major disengagement in the West Bank. And within a decade, we will unilaterally repartition Jerusalem along lines we will unilaterally select ... What Israelis have understood — and this is the underlying feature of the disengagement — is that we need to leave Gaza and Nablus, not because it will bring peace, but because there will be perpetual terror. We need to leave Gaza and Nablus because Israel with them is weaker than Israel without them."

== Published works ==
=== Books ===
- "Palestinians in Israel — the Arab Minority and the Jewish State". Tel Aviv: Zmora Bitan, 2011 (Hebrew)
- "Disengagement: Israel and the Palestinian Entity" (in Hebrew Korah Hahafrada: Yisrael Ve Harashut Hafalestinit). Tel Aviv: Zmora Bitan, 1999 (Hebrew)
- "Attrition: Egypt's Post War Political Strategy 1967-1970". Tel Aviv: Ma'arakhot/Misrad Ha-Bitahon, 1989 (Hebrew)
- "A Jordanian Option — Israel, Jordan and the Palestinians". Tel Aviv: Ha-Kibuts Ha-Meuhad, 1986 (Hebrew)

=== Articles ===
- "Voice of Palestine: The New Ideology of Israeli Arabs". Azure (Winter 2003)
- "High Fences Make Good Neighbors — Israel's Integration in 'The Emerging Mediterranean Culture'". The Emergence of a New Mediterranean Culture: Maghreb-Mashriq-Israel, ed. Wolfgang Freund, Frankfurt am Main: Peter Lang Pub. Inc., 2000, pp. 37–47
- "The Unique Nature of the War from the Arab Perspective". The Yom Kippur War — A Reappraisal, eds. Chaim Opaz and Yaacov Bar-Siman-Tov, Jerusalem: The Leonard Davis Institute, 1999, pp. 123–139 (Hebrew)
- "Jordan's 'Israeli Option'". Jordan in the Middle East 1948-1988 - The Making of a Pivotal State, eds. Joseph Nevo and Ilan Pappe, London: Frank Cass & Co, 1994, pp. 254–282
