= Tamar Hermann =

Israeli professor of political science

Tamar Hermann (Hebrew: תמר הרמן) is an Israeli professor of political science at the Open University and a senior fellow at the Israel Democracy Institute (IDI).

== Biography ==
Hermann is the academic director of IDI's Guttman Center for Surveys, the editor of IDI's annual Israeli Democracy Index, and the co-editor of the monthly Peace Index, a joint project of IDI and Tel Aviv University. The findings of the Peace Index have been published in Haaretz, Yediot Ahronoth, and other news sources, and are currently published in Hebrew every month on the Walla website. The findings of the Index can be found in full at www.peaceindex.org

Hermann is an expert in Israeli politics, public opinion-making and its measurement, foreign policy-making, civil society, and grassroots politics. From 2010 to 2011, she was the vice president of academic affairs at the Open University, and today she is its director of international academic initiatives. Hermann also served as the university's dean of academic affairs from 2006 to 2009. From 1994–2006 she directed the Tammy Steinmetz Center for Peace Research at Tel Aviv University.

Hermann received her BA, MA, and PhD in political science from Tel Aviv University. She wrote a doctoral thesis entitled "From the Peace Covenant [Brit Shalom] to Peace Now [Shalom Achshav] – The Pragmatic Pacifism of the Peace Camp in Israel: 1925–1985" (1990). She was a MacArthur Postdoctoral Fellow for Peace and Security at Princeton University, where she returned as a visiting research fellow. She was also a research fellow and visiting lecturer at the Hebrew University of Jerusalem and was a visiting research fellow at George Mason University's Institute for Conflict Analysis and Resolution, Queen's University in Belfast, and the WZB Berlin Social Science Center.

Hermann's current research focuses on Israeli public opinion on issues related to national security and Israel's socio-economic agenda, the phenomenon of civil protest, and formal and informal mechanisms for strengthening national identity in the global era.

Hermann's book, The Israeli Peace Movement – A Shattered Dream, was published by Cambridge University Press in 2009. She was writing a book on political, sociological, and cultural aspects of the Israel National Trail (Shvil Yisrael), to be published in 2017.

== Writings ==
- Hermann, Tamar, et al., The National Religious Sector in Israel 2014 (Jerusalem: The Israel Democracy Institute, 2015).
- Hermann, Tamar, et al., The Israeli Democracy Index, 2011, 2012, 2013, 2014. (Jerusalem: The Israel Democracy Institute, 2011–2014).
- Hermann, Tamar (ed.), By the People, For the People, Without the People? The Emergence of (Anti)Political Sentiment in Israel and in Western Democracies, (Jerusalem: The Israel Democracy Institute, 2011).
- Hermann, Tamar, The Israeli Peace Movement: A Shattered Dream (Cambridge University Press, 2009).
- Hermann, Tamar, 2005. "The Binational Idea in Israel / Palestine: Past and Present," Nations and Nationalism 11(3) (July): 381–402.
- Hermann, Tamar and Golan, Galia, 2004. "The Parliamentary Representation of Women: The Israeli Case," in: Manon Tremblay (ed.), Parliamentary Representation of Women: A Comparative International Study, Montreal: Remue-ménage Press: 251–275.
- Hermann, Tamar. "From Bottom to Top: Social Movements and Political Protest," Open University, 1995.
- Hermann, Tamar 2002. "The Sour Taste of Success: The Israeli Peace Movement, 1967–1998," in: Benjamin Gidron, Stanley N. Katz and Yeheskel Hasenfeld, (eds.), Mobilizing for Peace: Conflict Resolution in Northern Ireland, Israel/Palestine and South Africa, Oxford: Oxford University Press: 94–129.
- Hermann, Tamar, and Yuchtman-Yaar, Ephraim, 2002. "Divided yet United: Israeli Jewish Public Opinion on the Oslo Process," Journal of Peace Research (September): 597–613.
