= Zero-sum problem =

Mathematical problem

In number theory, zero-sum problems are certain kinds of combinatorial problems about the structure of a finite abelian group. Concretely, given a finite abelian group G and a positive integer n, one asks for the smallest value of k such that every sequence of elements of G of size k contains n terms that sum to 0.

The classic result in this area is the 1961 theorem of Paul Erdős, Abraham Ginzburg, and Abraham Ziv. They proved that for the group $\mathbb{Z}/n\mathbb{Z}$ of integers modulo n,

$k = 2n - 1.$

Explicitly this says that any multiset of 2n − 1 integers has a subset of size n the sum of whose elements is a multiple of n, but that the same is not true of multisets of size 2n − 2. (Indeed, the lower bound is easy to see: the multiset containing n − 1 copies of 0 and n − 1 copies of 1 contains no n-subset summing to a multiple of n.) This result is known as the Erdős–Ginzburg–Ziv theorem after its discoverers. It may also be deduced from the Cauchy–Davenport theorem.

More general results than this theorem exist, such as Olson's theorem, Kemnitz's conjecture (proved by Christian Reiher in 2003), and the weighted EGZ theorem (proved by David J. Grynkiewicz in 2005).

== See also ==
- Barycentric-sum problem
- Davenport constant
- Subset sum problem
- Zero-sum Ramsey theory
