= Abraham Ginzburg =

Israeli academic

- אברהם גינזבורג
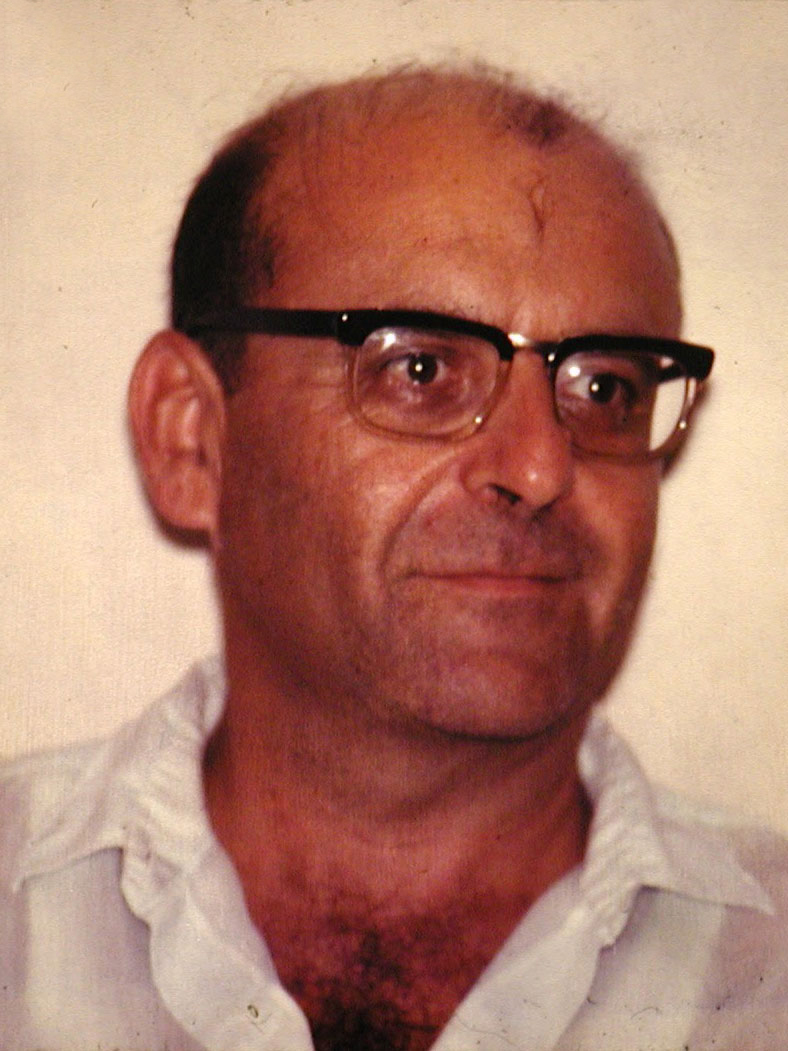
- Abraham Ginzburg
- Born: 1 August 1926; Navahrudak, Belarus
- Died: 30 December 2020 (aged 94); Tel Aviv, Israel
- Known for: Automata theory; The Erdős–Ginzburg–Ziv theorem
- Title: President of the Open University of Israel

Abraham Ginzburg (Hebrew: אברהם גינזבורג) (1926–2020) was a Professor Emeritus of Computer Science. He served as Vice President of the Technion Institute, and President of the Open University of Israel.

== Biography ==
Ginzburg was born on 1 August 1926 in Navahrudak, Belarus. He began acquiring his education during World War II, after which he taught the children of Sh'erit ha-Pletah mathematics. In 1949, Ginzburg immigrated to Israel, and began studying in the Technion Faculty of Electrical Engineering, where he received his BSc summa cum laude. Three years later, he acquired a Master's degree in electrical engineering and in 1959, he received his PhD in mathematics, and was appointed lecturer in the Faculty of Mathematics of the Technion.

During 1965–1967, he served as a visiting lecturer in Carnegie Mellon University, in Pittsburgh, Pennsylvania. Upon returning to Israel in 1967, he was appointed associate professor of Mathematics in the Technion Institute, and in 1971 to a professor of Computer Science. Ginzburg founded the Department of computer science in the Technion, and served as its first head of department. Later, he served as the vice president of development of the Technion.

In 1976, Ginzburg took part in the formation of the Open University of Israel, as its vice president, and from 1977 until 1987 served as its president

Ginzburg received an Honorary degree from the UK Open University in 1988, an Honorary PhD from the Weizmann Institute in 1990, and, in 2002 was awarded a Rotary Prize for the promotion of higher education in Israel.

Ginzburg was married to Pnina, and was a father of five.

== Research ==
Ginzburg completed his PhD in mathematics in the year 1959. The thesis title was "Multiplicative Systems as Homomorphic Images of Square Sets", and was done under the supervision of Prof. Dov Tamari.

During the early '60s, Ginzburg was involved in research in basic group theory, graph theory and automata, and frequently collaborated with Michael Yoeli.

In 1961, Ginzburg, in collaboration with Paul Erdős and Abraham Ziv, proved the Erdős-Ginzburg-Ziv Theorem. This Theorem is an important result in Abelian group theory, and is cited to this day.

In 1968, Ginzburg published his book "Algebraic Theory of Automata".

Ginzburg also invested a lot of time in writing several Textbooks in mathematics, for high school and first degree Mathematics and Engineering students.
