= Christian Reiher =

German mathematician (born 1984)

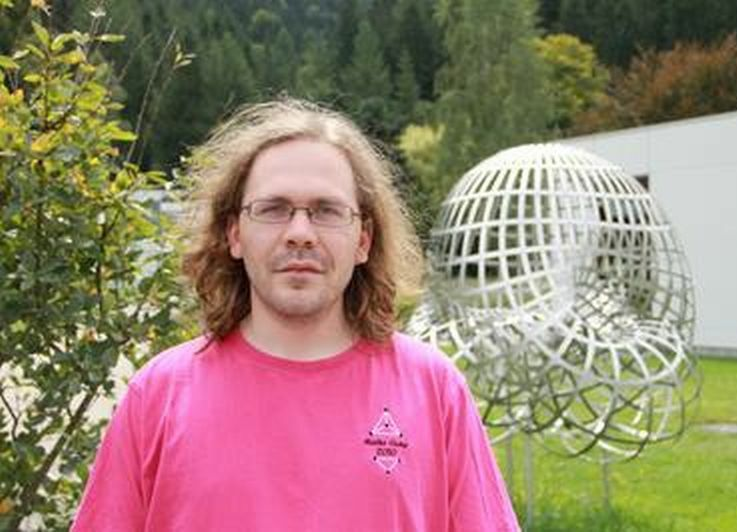
- Reiher in Oberwolfach, 2012
- Born: 19 April 1984 (age 42); Starnberg, Bavaria, West Germany
- Education: University of Rostock; LMU Munich
- Known for: Proving Kemnitz's conjecture
- Awards: European Prize in Combinatorics (2017)
- Scientific career
- Fields: Mathematics
- Workplaces: University of Hamburg
- Doctoral advisor: Hans-Dietrich Gronau

Christian Reiher (born 19 April 1984 in Starnberg) is a German mathematician. He is the fifth most successful participant in the history of the International Mathematical Olympiad, having won four gold medals in the years 2000 to 2003 and a bronze medal in 1999.

Just after finishing his Abitur, he proved Kemnitz's conjecture, an important problem in the theory of zero-sums. He went on to obtain his Diplom in mathematics at LMU Munich.

Reiher received his Dr. rer. nat. at the University of Rostock under supervision of Hans-Dietrich Gronau in February 2010 (Thesis: A proof of the theorem according to which every prime number possesses property B) and works now at the University of Hamburg.

== Selected publications ==
- ——— (2007), "On Kemnitz' conjecture concerning lattice-points in the plane", The Ramanujan Journal, 13 (1–3): 333–337, arXiv:1603.06161, doi:10.1007/s11139-006-0256-y, S2CID 119600313.
