= Judith Gal-Ezer =

Israeli computer science professor

- יהודית גל-עזר
- Education: Tel Aviv University
- Awards: ACM Fellow (2022); SIGCSE Award for Outstanding Contribution to Computer Science Education (2007)
- Scientific career
- Fields: Computer science education Gender; Teacher training
- Workplaces: Open University of Israel
- Website: www.openu.ac.il/en/personalsites/ProfJudithGalEzer.aspx

Judith Gal-Ezer (born 1947; Hebrew: יהודית גל-עזר) is an Israeli computer scientist and computer science educator known for her development of the high school computer science curriculum in Israel. She is a professor emerita at the Open University of Israel.

== Education and career ==
Gal-Ezer graduated from Tel Aviv University in 1968, and completed her PhD in applied mathematics there in 1978. She also studied for a diploma in computer science there from 1983 to 1985.

== Career and research ==
After working as an adjunct lecturer at Tel Aviv University, from 1980 to 1985, she joined the Open University faculty in 1990. She retired in 2016.

Gal-Ezer is one of the founders of the Computer Science Department at the Open University of Israel. She has served as head of Mathematics and Computer Science and as Vice President for Academic Affairs at the Open University, and as Advisor to the President on Women’s and Gender Issues. She has also been a leader in the development of Israel's high school computer science curriculum for over 25 years.

=== Awards and honors ===
In 2007 she won the SIGCSE Award for Outstanding Contribution to Computer Science Education. She was the winner of the IEEE Computer Society's 2015 Taylor L. Booth Education Award "for outstanding research and its practical application in the field of computer science education". She is the 2017 winner of the ACM Karl V. Karlstrom Outstanding Educator Award, "for her central role in developing a groundbreaking high-school computer science curriculum, her outstanding CS education research and her extensive service to the education community". She was named a 2021 ACM Fellow "for contributions to research and implementation in computer science education".
