= Yaacov Bar-Siman-Tov =

Israeli scholar (1946–2013)

- יעקב בר-סימן-טוב
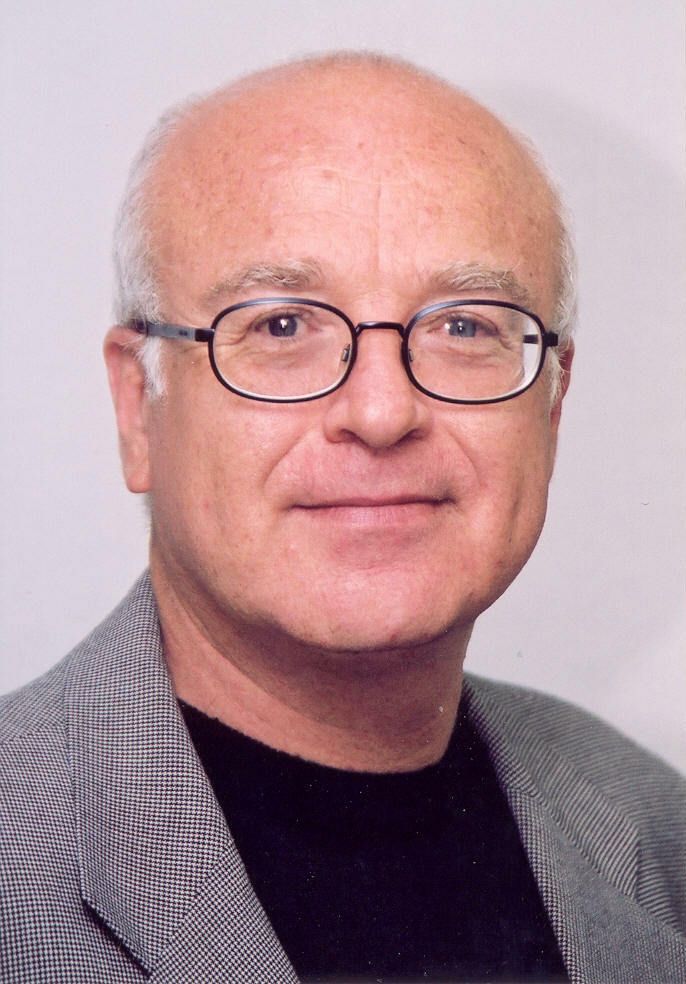
- Born: 1946
- Died: 2013 (aged 66–67)
- Education: Hebrew University of Jerusalem
- Occupations: Scholar of international relations and conflict resolution
- Notable work: Founding the Swiss Center for Conflict Research, Management and Resolution
- Awards: Israeli Association for International Studies' Lifetime Achievement Award

Yaacov Bar-Siman-Tov (Hebrew: יעקב בר-סימן-טוב; 1946–2013) was an Israeli international relations and conflict resolution scholar.

== Biography ==
Yaacov Bar-Siman-Tov received a bachelor's degree in Middle Eastern studies and Political Science, as well as a master's degree and a doctorate in International Relations, all from the Hebrew University of Jerusalem.

== Academic career ==
He was the Giancarlo Elia Valori Professor of International Relations at the Hebrew University of Jerusalem, where he held the "Chair for the Study of Peace and Regional Cooperation". He was also the Director of the "Swiss Center for Conflict Research, Management and Resolution" at the Hebrew University, and the Head of the Jerusalem Institute for Israel Studies. A recipient of the Israeli Association for International Studies' Lifetime Achievement Award, Professor Bar-Siman-Tov was a noted expert in the fields of management and resolution of international conflicts; negotiation; decision-making; and the Arab–Israeli conflict.

He was also a member of the Arabic and Middle Eastern Studies Advisory Board at Yale University Press; member of the "Global Faculty of Education for Peace" at the "International Education for Peace Institute"; and an associate partner at the "Jerusalem Peace Academy". He was listed in Who's Who in Academia and in Who's Who in International Organizations.

In 2000, Bar-Siman-Tov founded the Swiss Center for Conflict Research, Management and Resolution at the Hebrew University, the first center for the study of conflict resolution in Israel. and served as its director for many years afterward.

He was head of the Jerusalem Institute for Israel Studies, an independent, non-partisan, think-tank which provides data, policy papers, and professional analyses for a variety of governmental bodies, public institutions, civil organizations, decision-makers, researchers, and the general public.

He also held several additional senior academic positions at the Hebrew University, including Chair of the International Relations Department (1993–1996); "Chair of the Social Sciences Faculty Teaching Committee" (1996–1997); and "Director of the Leonard Davis Institute for International Relations" (1997–2003).

== Published works ==
Bar-Siman-Tov wrote extensively in the fields of international relations, negotiation, decision-making, and the Arab Israeli conflict. Since the 1990s, his research primarily has focused on conflict resolution, and on management and resolution of international conflicts.

He was the author of seven books:

- The Israeli-Egyptian War of Attrition 1969-1970: A Case Study of Limited Local War (Columbia University Press, 1980). It won the "Landau Prize" for the best book on Middle East studies for the year 1982.
- Linkage Politics in the Middle East: Syria Between Domestic and External Conflict, 1961-1970 (Westview Press, 1983)
- Israel the Superpowers and the War in the Middle East (Praeger, 1987)
- Israel and the Peace Process, 1977-1982: In Search of Legitimacy for Peace (SUNY Press, 1994)
- The Transition from War to Peace: The Complexity of Decisionmaking - The Israeli Case (The Tami Steinmetz Center for Peace Research, 1996)
- The Disengagement from the Gaza Strip and Northern Samaria: Evacuation, Compensation and Legitimization (The Jerusalem Institute for Israel Studies, 2007; with Keren Tamir)
- Justice and Peace in the Israeli-Palestinian Conflict (Routledge, 2015)

He was also the editor of several books, including:

- The Yom Kippur War: A New Perspective (The Leonard Davis Institute, 1999; with Chaim Ophaz)
- Stable Peace Among Nations (Rowman and Littlefield, 2000; with Arie M. Kacowicz, Ole Elgstrom, and Magnus Jerneck)
- From Conflict Resolution to Reconciliation (Oxford University Press, 2004)
- As the Generals See It: The Collapse of the Oslo Process and the Violent Israeli-Palestinian Conflict (The Leonard Davis Institute for International Relations, 2004)
- The Israeli-Palestinian Conflict from a Peace Process to a Violent Confrontation: 2000-2005 (Jerusalem Institute for Israel Studies, 2006) It won the Yitzhak Sadeh Prize for the best book in military studies for the year of 2006.
- The Israeli-Palestinian Conflict: From Conflict Resolution to Conflict Management (Palgrave-Macmillan, 2007)
- Forty Years in Jerusalem1967-2007 (The Jerusalem Institute for Israel Studies, 2009; with Ora Ahimeir)
- The Disengagement Plan – An Idea Shattered (The Jerusalem Institute for Israel Studies, 2009)
- Barriers to Peace in the Israeli-Palestinian Conflict (The Jerusalem Institute for Israel Studies, 2010)
