= Kemnitz's conjecture =

On centroids of sets of lattice points

In additive number theory, Kemnitz's conjecture states that every set of integer lattice points in the plane has a large subset whose centroid is also a lattice point. It was proved independently in the autumn of 2003 by Christian Reiher, then an undergraduate student, and Carlos di Fiore, then a high school student.

The exact formulation of this conjecture is as follows:

Let $n$ be a natural number and $S$ a set of $4n-3$ lattice points in plane. Then there exists a subset $S_1 \subseteq S$ with $n$ points such that the centroid of all points from $S_1$ is also a lattice point.

Kemnitz's conjecture was formulated in 1983 by Arnfried Kemnitz as a generalization of the Erdős–Ginzburg–Ziv theorem, an analogous one-dimensional result stating that every $2n-1$ integers have a subset of size $n$ whose average is an integer. In 2000, Lajos Rónyai proved a weakened form of Kemnitz's conjecture for sets with $4n-2$ lattice points. Then, in 2003, Christian Reiher proved the full conjecture using the Chevalley–Warning theorem.
