= Polynomial method in combinatorics =

In mathematics, the polynomial method is an algebraic approach to combinatorics problems that involves capturing some combinatorial structure using polynomials and proceeding to argue about their algebraic properties. Recently (around 2016), the polynomial method has led to the development of remarkably simple solutions to several long-standing open problems. The polynomial method encompasses a wide range of specific techniques for using polynomials and ideas from areas such as algebraic geometry to solve combinatorics problems. While a few techniques that follow the framework of the polynomial method, such as Alon's Combinatorial Nullstellensatz, have been known since the 1990s, it was not until around 2010 that a broader framework for the polynomial method has been developed.

== Mathematical overview ==
Many uses of the polynomial method follow the same high-level approach. The approach is as follows:

- Embed some combinatorial problem into a vector space.
- Capture the hypotheses of the problem by constructing a polynomial of low-degree that is zero on a certain set
- After constructing the polynomial, argue about its algebraic properties to deduce that the original configuration must satisfy the desired properties.

=== Example ===
As an example, we outline Dvir's proof of the Finite Field Kakeya Conjecture using the polynomial method.

Finite Field Kakeya Conjecture: Let $\mathbb{F}_q$ be a finite field with $q$ elements. Let $K \subseteq \mathbb{F}_q^n$ be a Kakeya set, i.e. for each vector $y \in \mathbb{F}_q^n$there exists $x \in \mathbb{F}_q^n$ such that $K$ contains a line $\{x + ty, t \in \mathbb{F}_q \}$. Then the set $K$ has size at least $c_nq^n$where $c_n > 0$ is a constant that only depends on $n$.

Proof: The proof we give will show that $K$ has size at least $c_nq^{n-1}$. The bound of $c_nq^n$ can be obtained using the same method with a little additional work.

Assume we have a Kakeya set $K$ with

$|K| < {q+n-3\choose n-1}$

Consider the set of monomials of the form $x_1^{d_1}x_2^{d_2} \dots x_n^{d_n}$ of degree exactly $q-2$. There are exactly ${q+n-3\choose n-1}$ such monomials. Thus, there exists a nonzero homogeneous polynomial $P(x_1,x_2, \dots , x_n)$ of degree $q-2$ that vanishes on all points in $K$. Note this is because finding such a polynomial reduces to solving a system of $|K|$ linear equations for the coefficients.

Now we will use the property that $K$ is a Kakeya set to show that $P$ must vanish on all of $\mathbb{F}_q^n$. Clearly $P(0,0 \dots , 0) = 0$. Next, for $y \neq 0$, there is an $x$ such that the line $\{x + ty, t \in \mathbb{F}_q \}$ is contained in $K$. Since $P$ is homogeneous, if $P(z) = 0$ for some $z \in \mathbb{F}_q^n$ then $P(cz) = 0$ for any $c \in \mathbb{F}_q$. In particular

$P(tx + y) = P(t(x+t^{-1}y)) = 0$

for all nonzero $t \in \mathbb{F}_q$. However, $P(tx+y)$ is a polynomial of degree $q-2$ in $t$ but it has at least $q-1$ roots corresponding to the nonzero elements of $\mathbb{F}_q$ so it must be identically zero. In particular, plugging in $t = 0$ we deduce $P(y) = 0$.

We have shown that $P(y) = 0$ for all $y \in \mathbb{F}_q^n$ but $P$ has degree less than $q - 1$ in each of the variables so this is impossible by the Schwartz–Zippel lemma. We deduce that we must actually have

$|K| \ge {q+n-3\choose n-1} \sim \frac{q^{n-1}}{(n-1)!}$

=== Polynomial partitioning ===
A variation of the polynomial method, often called polynomial partitioning, was introduced by Guth and Katz in their solution to the Erdős distinct distances problem. Polynomial partitioning involves using polynomials to divide the underlying space into regions and arguing about the geometric structure of the partition. These arguments rely on results from algebraic geometry bounding the number of incidences between various algebraic curves. The technique of polynomial partitioning has been used to give a new proof of the Szemerédi–Trotter theorem via the polynomial ham sandwich theorem and has been applied to a variety of problems in incidence geometry.

== Applications ==
A few examples of longstanding open problems that have been solved using the polynomial method are:

- The finite field Kakeya conjecture by Dvir
- The cap set problem by Ellenberg and Gijswijt with the original framework developed on the analogous problem over $\mathbb{Z}_4^n$ by Croot, Lev and Pach
- The Erdős distinct distances problem by Guth and Katz
- The Joints Problem in 3D by Guth and Katz. Their argument was later simplified by Elekes, Kaplan and Sharir

== See also ==
- Combinatorial Nullstellensatz
