= Open University of Israel =

Distance-education university in Israel

- האוניברסיטה הפתוחה جامعة إسرائيل المفتوحة
- Motto: הרבה מעבר לתואר, lit. 'far more than a degree'
- Type: Distance education; Public
- Established: 1974
- Chairman: (of the executive Committee): Uri Yaron
- Chancellor: Dorit Beinisch
- President: Mimi Ajzenstadt
- Rector: Iris Shagrir
- Director: Meir Bing
- Students: 52,102 (2022)
- Undergraduates: 49,399 (2022)
- Postgraduates: 2,703 (2022)
- Location: Ra'anana, Israel; 32°11′19″N 34°53′16″E
- Website: www.openu.ac.il

The Open University of Israel (Hebrew: האוניברסיטה הפתוחה, Ha-Universita ha-Ptuha, Arabic: جامعة إسرائيل المفتوحة) is a distance-education university in Israel. It is one of ten public universities in Israel recognized by the Council of Higher Education (CHE).

Open University teaching methods are based primarily on distance learning technologies, with the option of face-to-face tutorial sessions. Campuses are located in Ra'anana, Tel Aviv, Jerusalem, Haifa, Beersheba, Givat Haviva, and Nazareth, in addition to approximately fifty study centers located throughout the country. Most students study remotely from their homes in Israel and around the world. As in other higher education institutions, graduation from the OUI is contingent upon successfully fulfilling degree requirements; English-language proficiency is also required. The university offers bachelor's degrees, a number of master's degree programs, and a doctoral program in Education: Technologies in Learning Systems. Acceptance requirements for master's programs are similar to those at most universities.

== Goal ==
The goal of the open university was to make higher education more accessible both by removing the physical barrier, making it possible to learn from anywhere (including outside of Israel), removing the time barrier, not requiring students to attend classes at specific times, making it possible for working people to study after work, and also removing the barrier of minimum requirements of Israel's matriculation examinations ("Bagrut"), and the Psychometric exams, thus allowing people who were not able to finish high-school or achieved low grades to still pursue academic studies

== History ==
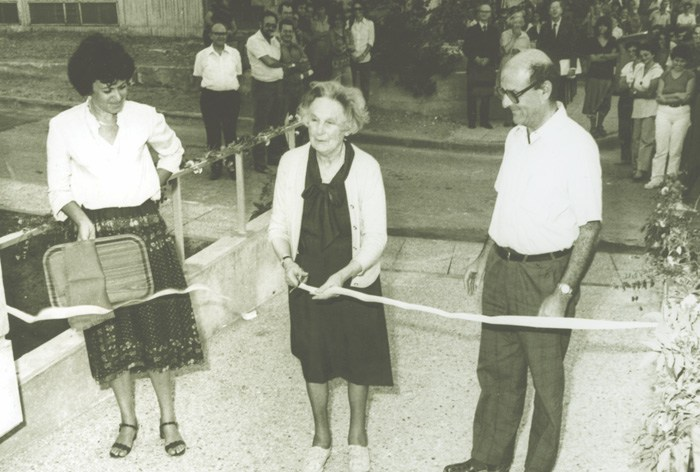
The inauguration ceremony of the Tel Aviv campus: Prof. Avraham Ginzburg (right), President of the University, and Dorothy de Rothschild (center), 1976

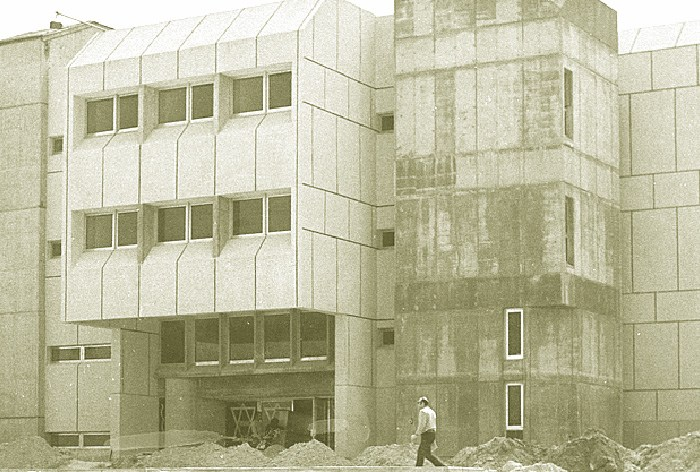
The OUI Ramat Aviv campus

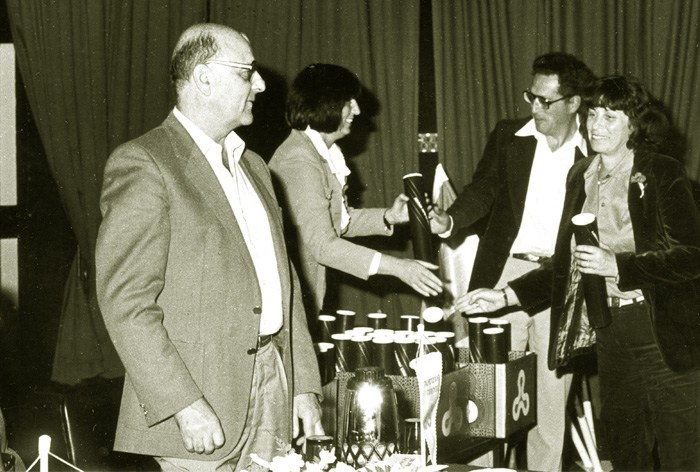
One of the university’s first graduation ceremonies

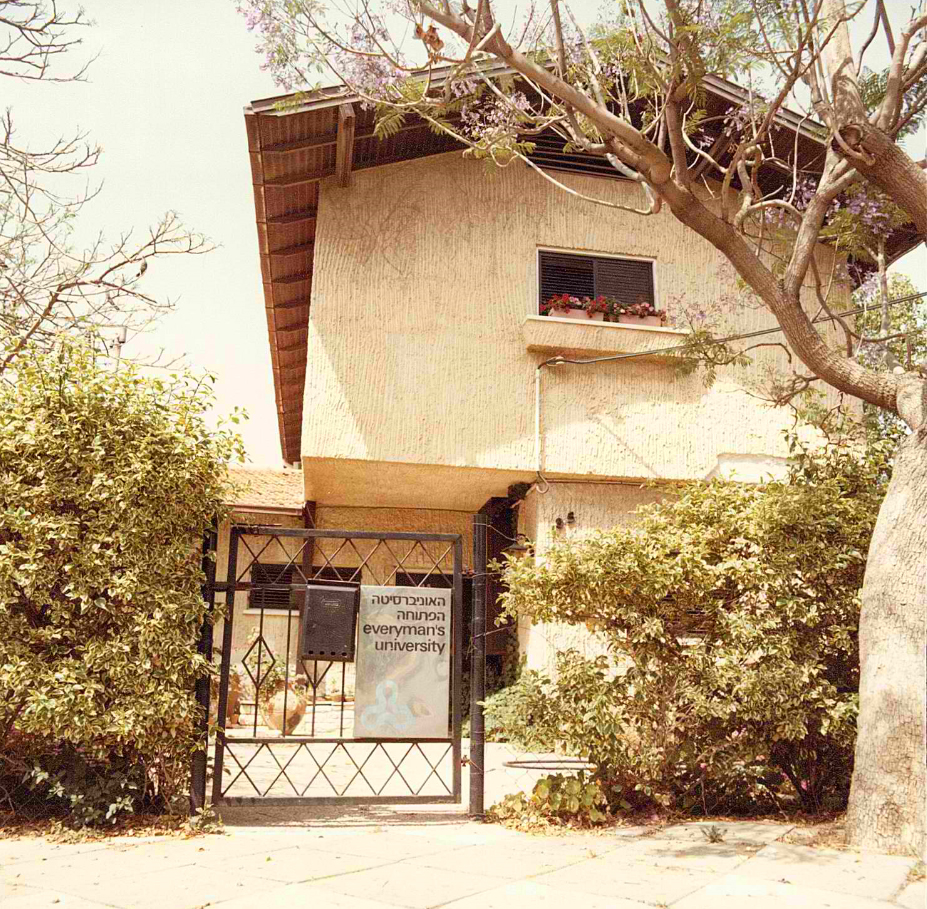
The villa in Afeka which housed the University’s offices in its early days, 1974

In 1971, a committee appointed by the CHE and chaired by Professor Shneior Lifson proposed the establishment of an open university, following the model of the Open University UK. The Edmond de Rothschild Foundation (Israel) endorsed the idea and offered to fund its establishment, based on the recommendation of a committee of experts chaired by Professor Wilbur Schramm of Stanford University. The proposal was introduced to the Minister of Education and Culture at the time, Yigal Allon. Under his leadership, in 1973, the government and the CHE decided to establish a “university for all.” In 1988 the university changed its name from Everyman's University to The Open University of Israel. In 1976, the Open University began operating from its headquarters in Ramat Aviv, with an enrollment of 2,267 students. Five courses were initially offered. The university had 130 employees, including nine senior academic faculty members and 31 teaching faculty (including course coordinators and tutors). An agreement signed in 1995 between the university and the Ra’anana municipality led to construction of the Dorothy de Rothschild campus. In 2004, construction was completed and university headquarters were relocated to the new main campus in Ra’anana.

== Academics ==
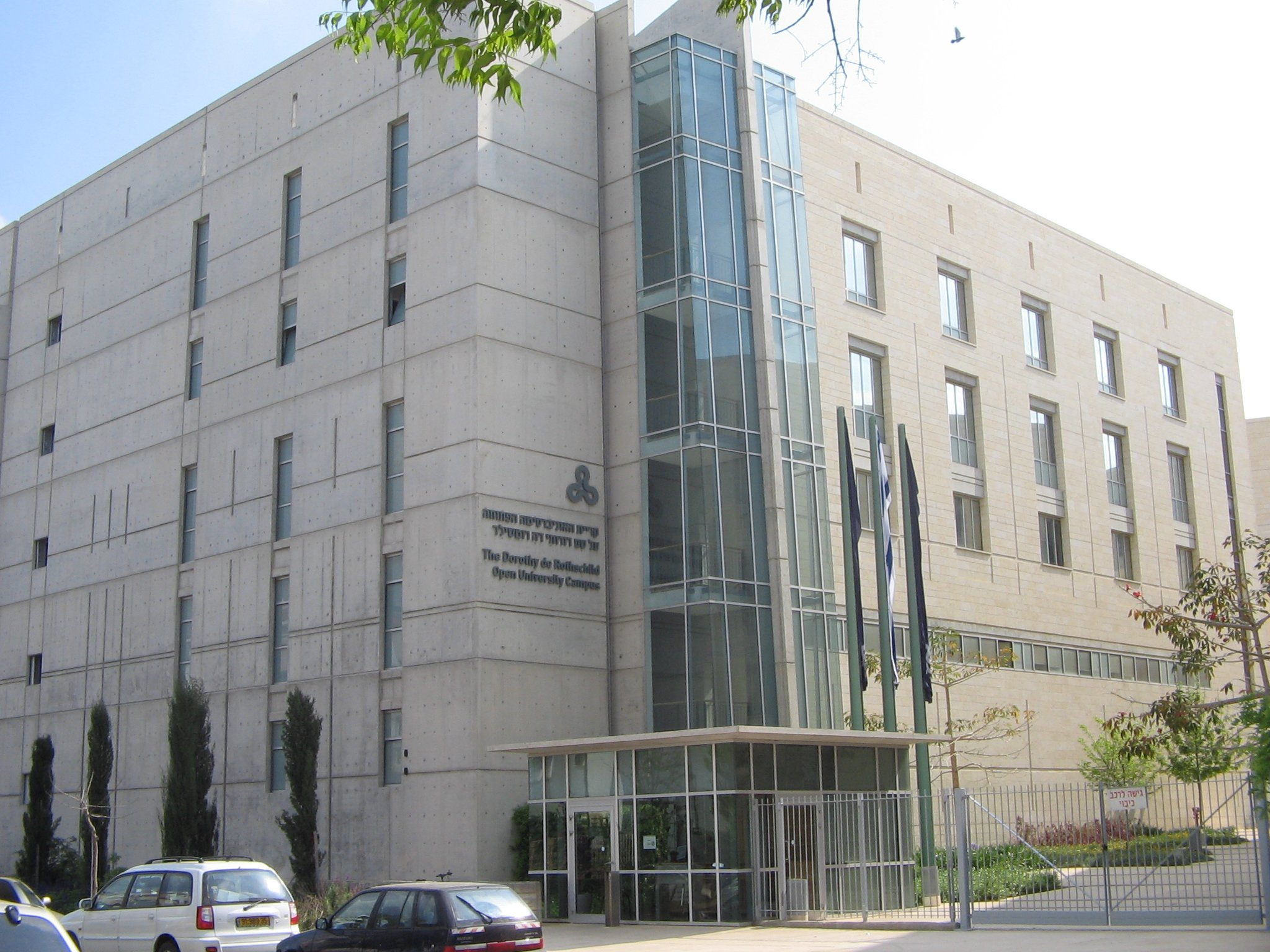
Campus of the Open University of Israel

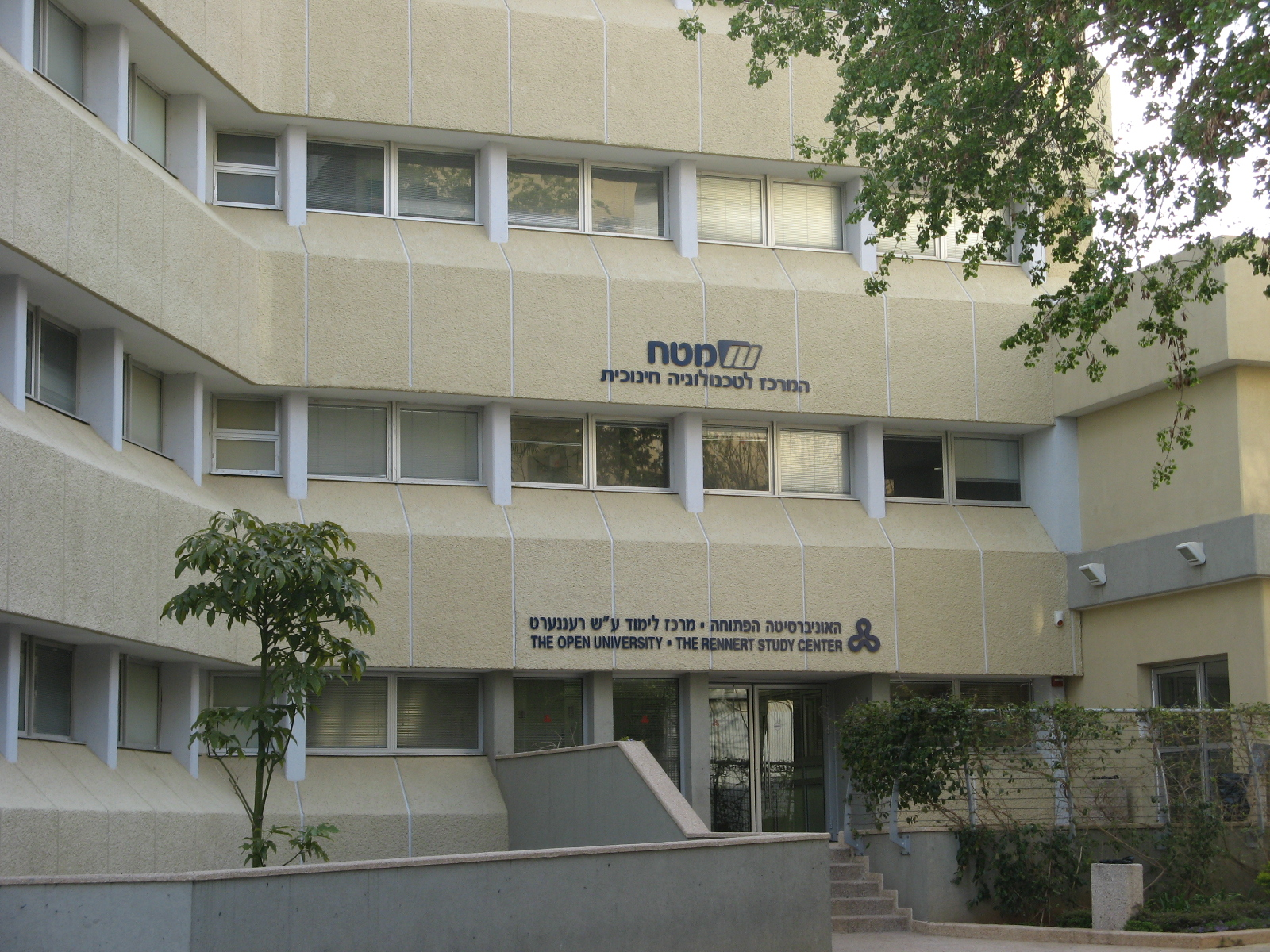
The Rennert Study Center

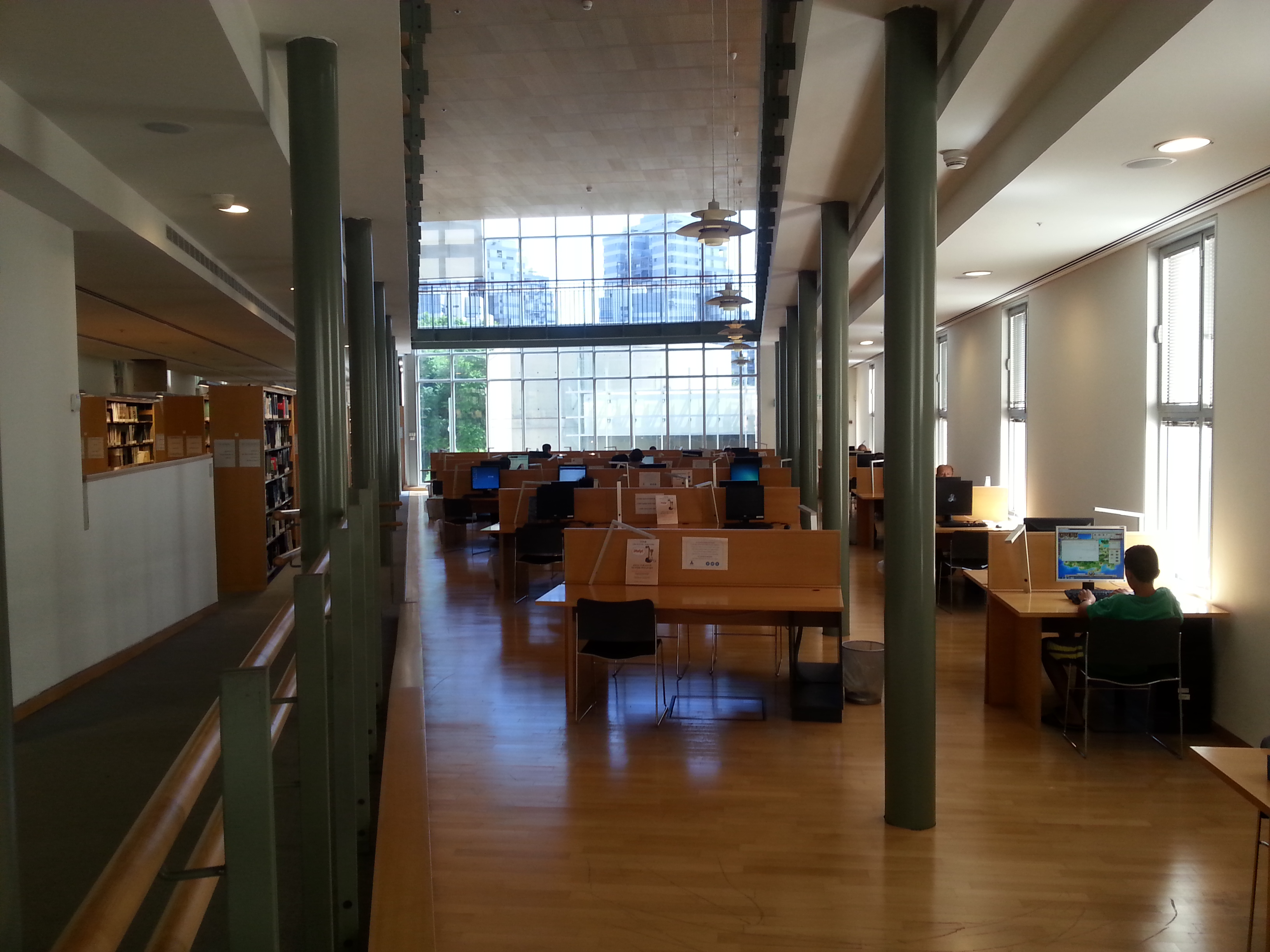
Library of Open University of Israel

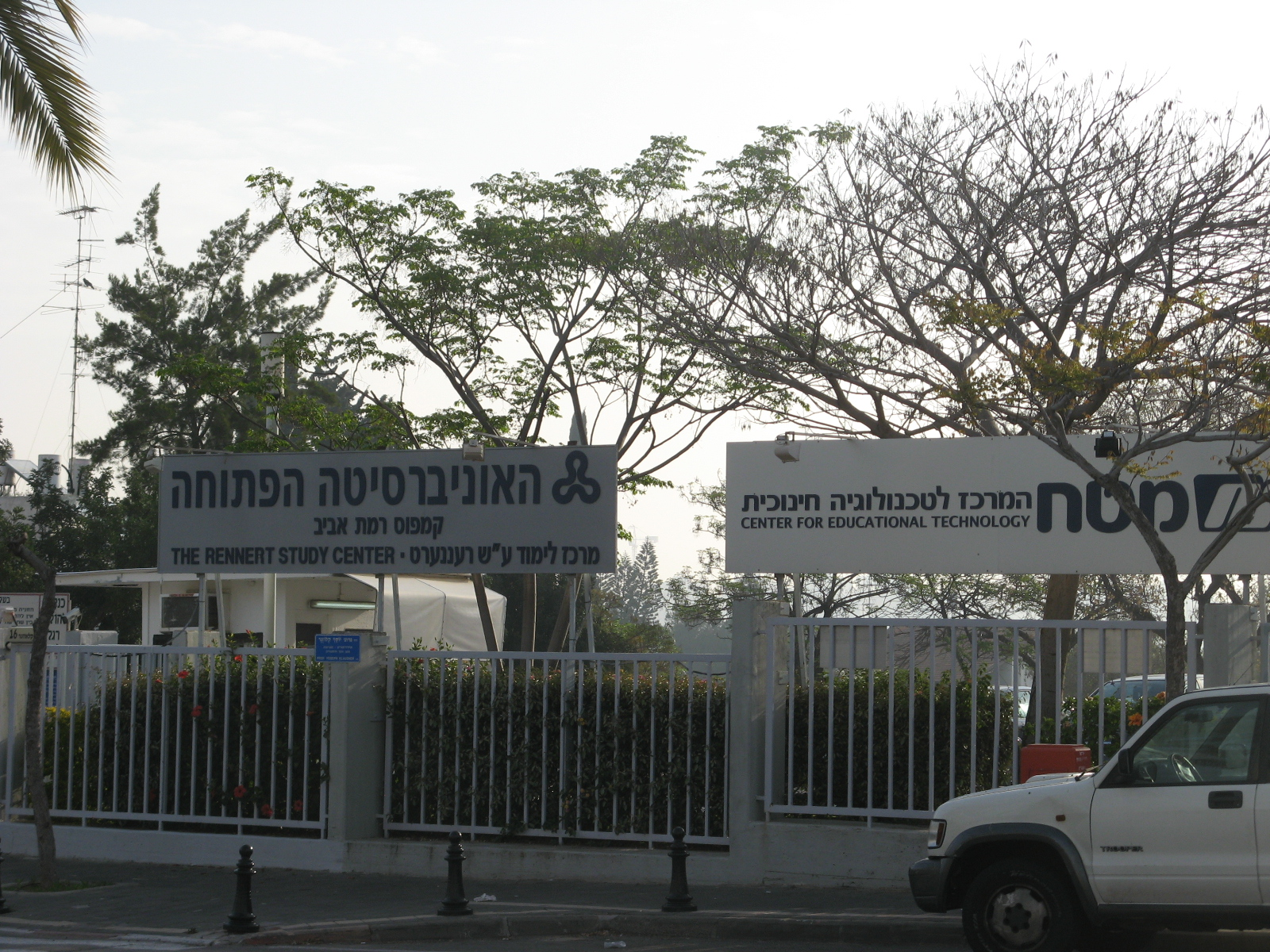
Ramat Aviv campus

=== Academic departments ===
The Open University has seven academic departments:

- History, Philosophy and Judaic Studies
- Language, Literature, and the Arts
- Mathematics and Computer Science
- Natural and Life Sciences
- Management and Economics
- Sociology, Political Science, and Communication
- Education and Psychology

=== Study method ===
Studies towards a degree at the Open University are structured on a course-by-course basis, rather than year-by-year or program based, as in traditional universities. All courses are designed for independent study, using textbooks and online learning materials produced specifically for the OUI. Course websites feature additional study materials, technological aids, and forums for consulting with academic faculty and other students. Students have the option of attending in-person or online tutorials for review of study material. Course coordinators manage all aspects of the courses they teach, including assignment and exam development, and monitoring of course websites. Tutors review material in weekly or bi-weekly tutorials and grade assignments.

=== Study programs ===
Courses are clustered into study programs. In order to graduate, students must accumulate the full credits required for a degree (usually 120 credits). The OUI offers bachelor's, master's, doctoral, and diploma study programs. Students may pursue a general undergraduate degree in the humanities or social sciences, or a degree in a specific discipline. In most disciplines, degrees are either single or dual-disciplinary. Currently, the OUI offers one PhD program.

=== Transfer tracks ===
A credit transfer program, in conjunction with other top Israeli universities, allows students to begin their studies at the OUI without admission requirements and demonstrate scholastic success. Students who successfully complete a cluster of OUI courses (according to specific study program requirements), are generally accepted as transfer students to any traditional university in Israel.

== The Research Authority ==
The Dean of Research heads the Research Authority (RA) and the OUI research institutes, and oversees research ethics. The RA helps facilitate the presentation of research proposals to competitive funding bodies and the publication of research studies in journals and other scholarly publications. The RA manages research budgets, physical infrastructure, and personnel. It formulates agreements with other academic institutions to host OUI researchers who require specialized research infrastructure not available at the OUI, and advances partnerships between OUI researchers and colleagues in other universities. A steering committee composed of five senior faculty members and headed by the dean of research operates alongside the RA.

=== OpMop Ltd. ===
OpMop Ltd., founded in 2008, is a technology transfer subsidiary of the OUI that files patents for OUI faculty members and assists with all intellectual property matters related to research and technology development.

=== Research institutes ===
OUI research institutes provide a framework for interdisciplinary research in a variety of fields, and forge reciprocal and cross-departmental collaborations. The centers provide support for researchers as they generate new scientific knowledge, and foster collaboration and programming with colleagues in Israel and abroad.

=== Institute for Policy Analysis ===
The Institute for Policy Analysis promotes research on theoretical, empirical, and applied subjects related to policy design and implementation, and social, political, and economic processes and mechanisms. The institute focuses on policy analysis and contemporary social issues.

=== Research Center for Innovation in Learning Technologies ===
The Research Center for Innovation in Learning Technologies explores the integration of new educational technologies in study methods. The center encourages research by OUI faculty aimed at improving the understanding of teaching and learning processes in technology-rich environments, and the integration of innovative technologies in the teaching of academic courses, particularly at the OUI. The center works in close cooperation with the Shoham Center for Technology in Distance Education.

=== The Institute for the Study of Relations between Jews, Christians, and Muslims ===
The institute supports research groups and organizes events related to topics of interest to the public that enhance the understanding and relationship between the three Abrahamic religions.

=== Astrophysics Research Center (ARCO) ===
The center functions as a scientific, institutional, and applied hub for the research of theoretical, observational, and empirical topics and issues in astrophysics, including cosmology, relativist gravity and planetary science.

=== Open Media and Information Lab (OMILab) ===
OMILab serves as a base for multidisciplinary digital projects. It facilitates partnerships between researchers from different disciplines, such as sociology, computer science, management, communications, education, psychology, and digital humanities.

== Academic Development and Publishing ==
The Academic Development and Publishing Department manages and monitors course development from start to finish, and publishes course books and related materials. Development is carried out in teams composed of faculty members, pedagogic and technological advisors, editors, graphic designers, film directors, and scriptwriters. The OUI publishes under two imprints: Lamda Scholarship, and Lamda Books. Lamda Scholarship was founded in 2013 as a platform for publishing innovative research-based Hebrew books in the humanities and social sciences. The university provides comprehensive peer-review, editing and design services. Lamda Scholarship secures publishing grants for selected books from various foundations, and is a member of the Israeli Association of Book Publishers. Lamda Books publishes OUI textbooks which are sold in commercial bookstores countrywide, as well as online and in the Ra’anana campus bookstore. The books serve OUI students as well as students in other academic institutions throughout Israel.

=== Journals ===
The OUI publishes two Hebrew-language academic journals, Kriot Yisraeliot (Israeli readings) is a digital, multidisciplinary journal which focuses on empirical and theoretical issues relevant to Israeli society and Zmanim., is a history quarterly, co-published with Tel Aviv University and the Historical Society of Israel.

== The Shoham Center for Technology in Distance Education ==
The Shoham center develops and implements technology-based pedagogic solutions for producing and teaching courses. Some of the realms of development include the OPAL online learning environment, online exam systems, assistance in exam design, learning analytics, state-of-the-art video studios for live broadcasts, and educational video production and filmed courses.

== Resource Development and External Relations ==
The resource development and external relations department develops relationships with donors in Israel and abroad, and fundraises for OUI programs and scholarships. The American Friends of the Open University of Israel was formed in the early 1980s. In 2017, the Israeli and British associations of Friends of the Open University were founded in Israel. In 2018, Friends associations were founded in France and Switzerland. The university has also benefited from Latin American support since 2017.

== Students ==
More than 50,000 students are currently enrolled in the Open University. In addition to a typical student population, the OUI also attracts under-resourced communities, due to its flexible study system and focus on student support. The OUI is popular with mature students who combine studies with full-time employment, high school students, who take university courses in lieu of high school matriculation courses through the Academia in High School program, and conscripts combining university studies with military service. In addition, the university has support systems in place to assist students studying from abroad, and students with disabilities.

=== Student Association ===
The Open University's student association provides services and activities in order to improve the university experience of its diverse student population. The association's academic department has instituted several projects to support students in their studies. The scholarship and social engagement department promotes volunteering in non-profit organizations such as the SAHAR mental health association, and the LATET organization for humanitarian aid. The association tailors its efforts to the needs of the student body.

== External studies ==
The External Studies Center offers inservice training, and enrichment and professional development in a variety of fields.

=== Professional development for educators ===
The Professional Development Unit offers professional development opportunities for educators in the wider teaching community and facilitates processes of educational and technological innovation in schools throughout the country.

=== Ascolot School of Interdisciplinary Studies ===
The Ascolot School of Interdisciplinary Studies offers courses in the arts, music, sciences, Judaic studies, literature, philosophy, law and history. Three long-established forums provide informative lectures to the wider community: Government and Strategy: Intelligence and National Security, and economic and legal forums.

=== Hasifa School of Communication, Television and Multimedia ===
Offers several study tracks, some of which grant credit towards an undergraduate degree.

=== Tafnit School of Continuing Education for Managers ===
Training for managers, CEOs, human resource managers, as well as courses in information science, business mentoring, and life-coaching.

=== Diploma School of Certificate Studies ===
Professional training in design, tourism and bookkeeping and prepares students for certification exams in these fields.

=== DiAlog School of Languages ===
Language courses in nine different languages for various organizations and for Israeli diplomats.

=== Meirav School for Complementary Medicine ===
Trains practitioners in a variety of complementary therapies.

== University management ==
=== Presidents ===
Portrait	Name	Began tenure	Ended tenure
	Max Rowe	1976	1977
	Abraham Ginzburg	1977	1987
	Nehemia Levtzion	1987	1992
	Menahem Yaari	1992	1997
	Eliahu Nissim	1997	2003
	Gershon Ben-Shakhar	2003	2008
	Hagit Messer Yaron	2008	2013
	Jacob Metzer	2013	2018
	Mimi Ajzenstadt	2018	2023
	Leo Corry	2023	-

=== Rectors ===
Portrait	Name	Began tenure	Ended tenure
	Shneior Lifson	1974	1975
	Abraham Ginzburg	1977	1987
	Yona Peles	1977	1987
	Israel Shatzman	1979	1984
	Shalom Reichman	1984	1986
	Ruth Beyth-Marom	1966	1999
	Judith Gal-Ezer	1999	2005
	Ora Limor	2005	2009
	Judith Gal-Ezer	2009	2012
	Tamar Hermann	2012	2013
	Aviad Heifetz	2013	2017
	Sara Guri-Rosenblit	2017	2019
	Guy Miron	2019	2023
	Iris Shagrir	2023	-

=== Director Generals ===
- Ehud Or - 1991–1996
- Giora Ullmann - 1996–2004
- David Klibanski - 2004–2009
- Amit Streit - 2009–2020
- Ruth Shoham - 2021–2024
- Meir Bing - 2024-present

== See also ==
- List of Israeli universities and colleges
