= Academic ranks in Israel =

Academic ranks in Israel are the titles, relative importance and power of professors, researchers, and administrative personnel held in academia.

== Overview ==
Tenured and tenure-track positions are as follows:

- Professor emeritus/emerita (full professor who has retired)
- Full professor [Hebrew: "Professor Min HaMinyan"]
- Associate professor [Hebrew: "Professor Khaver"]
- Senior lecturer [Hebrew: "Martze Bakhir"]
- Lecturer [Hebrew: "Martze"]

== Professorship ==
The ranking system combines the British system and the German one. There are four faculty ranks rather than three: lecturer (martsé), senior lecturer (martsé bakhír), associate professor (profésor khavér), and full professor (profésor min ha-minyán). The two lower ranks are similar to their counterparts in the British system. The two higher ranks originally had German rather than American equivalents: professor khavér was comparable to professor extraordinarius, while professor min ha-minyan was the equivalent, and Hebrew translation of, professor ordinarius. Traditionally, lecturer is equivalent to the American assistant professor rank, senior lecturer with tenure is equivalent to the American associate professor rank. Promotion from lecturer to senior lecturer rank usually entails tenure, but not always. Tenure (not guaranteed) is granted after 4–7 years (depending on institution and academic achievements). A professor khavér is comparable to the American advanced associate professor; some academics never become a "profésor min ha-minyan." Israeli universities do not, as a rule, grant tenure to new hires, regardless of previous position, rank, or eminence. A candidate is typically considered for tenure together with promotion to the next highest rank. Candidates who were recruited at a higher rank may also be considered for tenure following a trial period (varying across institutes).

In 2012, the Technion began granting senior lecturers the title of assistant professor (profésor mishné), in alignment with the standard American terminology. This was done after faculty members at the rank of senior lecturers had complained that they felt belittled at international conferences when compared to their American peers bearing the title assistant professor, because "lecturer" sounds less impressive than "professor". This move was considered controversial at other Israeli universities, which retain the senior lecturer ranking, because it was conducted unilaterally by the Technion without coordination with the other universities.
