= Abraham Ziv =

Israeli mathematician

- אברהם זיו
- Born: March 6, 1940; Israel
- Died: March 5, 2013 (aged 72); Israel
- Education: Technion – Israel Institute of Technology and Harvard University
- Scientific career
- Fields: Mathematics
- Thesis: A contribution to the zero sum theorem (1961)

Abraham Ziv (Hebrew: אברהם זיו; March 6, 1940–March 5, 2013 (aged 72)) was an Israeli mathematician, known for his contributions to the Zero-sum problem as one of the discoverers of the Erdős–Ginzburg–Ziv theorem.

== Biography ==
Abraham Zubkowski (later Ziv) was born in Avihayil to Haim and Zila Zubkovski. In the 1950s, he changed his surname as part of the widespread Hebraization of surnames trend. He studied at the Technion – Israel Institute of Technology, where he earned his Ph.D. in mathematics, after receiving his master's degree from Harvard University.

== Academic career ==
In 1961, at the age of 21, Ziv proved along with Paul Erdős and Abraham Ginzburg the general result that every sequence of $2n - 1\$ elements of $\mathbb{Z}/n\mathbb{Z}$ contains $n$ terms that sum to zero.

In 1972 Ziv was part of the founding team of IBM R&D Labs in Israel, where he stayed until retirement. In his time at IBM he wrote 21 more publications and 6 patents.

== Academic papers ==
- Paul Erdős; Abraham Ginzburg; Abraham Ziv (1961). "Theorem in the additive number theory" (PDF). The Bulletin of the Research Council of Israel – via Rényi Alfréd Matematikai Kutatóintézet.
