= Davenport constant =

Mathematical constant

In mathematics, the Davenport constant $D(G)$ is an invariant of a group studied in additive combinatorics, quantifying the size of nonunique factorizations. Given a finite abelian group $G$, $D(G)$ is defined as the smallest number such that every sequence of elements of that length contains a non-empty subsequence adding up to 0. In symbols, this is

$$D(G) = \min\left\{ N : \forall\left(\{g_n\}_{n=1}^N \in G^N\right)\left(\exists\{n_k\}_{k=1}^K : \sum_{k=1}^K{g_{n_k}} = 0\right) \right\}.$$

== Example ==
- The Davenport constant for the cyclic group $G = \mathbb Z/n\mathbb Z$ is $n$. To see this, note that the sequence of a fixed generator, repeated $n-1$ times, contains no subsequence with sum 0. Thus $D(G)\ge n$. On the other hand, if $\{g_k\}_{k=1}^n$ is an arbitrary sequence, then two of the sums in the sequence $\left\{\sum_{k=1}^K{g_k}\right\}_{K=1}^n$ are equal. The difference of these two sums also gives a subsequence with sum 0.

== Properties ==
- Consider a finite abelian group $G=\oplus_i C_{d_i}$, where the $d_1|d_2|\dots|d_r$ are invariant factors. Then
  $$D(G) \ge M(G) = 1-r+\sum_i{d_i}.$$
  The lower bound is proved by noting that the sequence consisting of $d_1$ copies of $(1,0,\dots,0)$, $d_2$ copies of $(0,1,\dots,0)$, etc., contains no subsequence with sum 0.
- $D=M$ for p-groups or when $r$ is 1 or 2.
- $D=M$ for certain groups including all groups of the form $C_2\oplus C_{2n}\oplus C_{2nm}$ and $C_3\oplus C_{3n}\oplus C_{3nm}$.
- There are infinitely many examples with $r$ at least 4 where $D$ does not equal $M$; it is not known whether there are any with $r=3$.
- Let $\exp(G)$ be the exponent of $G$. Then
  $$\frac{D(G)}{\exp(G)} \leq 1+\log\left(\frac{|G|}{\exp(G)}\right).$$

== Applications ==
The original motivation for studying Davenport's constant was the problem of non-unique factorization in number fields. Let $\mathcal{O}$ be the ring of integers in a number field, $G$ its class group. Then every element $\alpha\in\mathcal{O}$, which factors into at least $D(G)$ non-trivial ideals, is properly divisible by an element of $\mathcal{O}$. This observation implies that Davenport's constant determines by how much the lengths of different factorization of some element in $\mathcal{O}$ can differ.

The upper bound mentioned above plays an important role in Ahlford, Granville and Pomerance's proof of the existence of infinitely many Carmichael numbers.

== Variants ==
Olson's constant $O(G)$ uses the same definition, but requires the elements of $\{g_n\}_{n=1}^N$ to be distinct.

- Balandraud proved that $O(C_p)$ equals the smallest $k$ such that $\frac{k(k+1)}{2} \geq p$.
- For $p>6000$ we have
  $$O(C_p\oplus C_p) = p-1+O(C_p).$$
  On the other hand, if $G=C_p^r$ with $r\ge p$, then Olson's constant equals the Davenport constant.
