= Restricted sumset =

Sumset of a field subject to a specific polynomial restriction

In additive number theory and combinatorics, a restricted sumset has the form

$$S=\{a_1+\cdots+a_n:\ a_1\in A_1,\ldots,a_n\in A_n \ \mathrm{and}\ P(a_1,\ldots,a_n)\not=0\},$$

where $A_1,\ldots,A_n$ are finite nonempty subsets of a field F and $P(x_1,\ldots,x_n)$ is a polynomial over F.

If $P$ is a constant non-zero function, for example $P(x_1,\ldots,x_n)=1$ for any $x_1,\ldots,x_n$, then $S$ is the usual sumset $A_1+\cdots+A_n$ which is denoted by $nA$ if $A_1=\cdots=A_n=A.$

When

$$P(x_1,\ldots,x_n) = \prod_{1 \le i < j \le n} (x_j-x_i),$$

S is written as $A_1\dotplus\cdots\dotplus A_n$ which is denoted by $n^{\wedge} A$ if $A_1=\cdots=A_n=A.$

Note that |S| > 0 if and only if there exist $a_1\in A_1,\ldots,a_n\in A_n$ with $P(a_1,\ldots,a_n)\not=0.$

== Cauchy–Davenport theorem ==
The Cauchy–Davenport theorem, named after Augustin Louis Cauchy and Harold Davenport, asserts that for any prime p and nonempty subsets A and B of the prime-order cyclic group $\mathbb{Z}/p\mathbb{Z}$ we have the inequality

$$|A+B| \ge \min\{p,\, |A|+|B|-1\}$$

where $A+B := \{a+b \pmod p \mid a \in A, b \in B\}$, i.e. using modular arithmetic. It can be generalised to arbitrary (not necessarily abelian) groups using a Dyson transform. If $A, B$ are subsets of a group $G$, then

$$|AB| \ge \min\{p(G),\, |A|+|B|-1\}$$

where $p(G)$ is the size of the smallest nontrivial subgroup of $G$ (we set it to $\infty$ if there is no such subgroup).

This can be used to deduce the Erdős–Ginzburg–Ziv theorem: given any sequence of 2n−1 elements in the cyclic group $\mathbb{Z}/n\mathbb{Z}$, there are n elements that sum to zero modulo n. (Here n does not need to be prime.)

A direct consequence of the Cauchy-Davenport theorem is: Given any sequence S of p−1 or more nonzero elements, not necessarily distinct, of $\mathbb{Z}/p\mathbb{Z}$, every element of $\mathbb{Z}/p\mathbb{Z}$ can be written as the sum of the elements of some subsequence (possibly empty) of S.

Kneser's theorem generalises this to general abelian groups.

== Erdős–Heilbronn conjecture ==
The Erdős–Heilbronn conjecture posed by Paul Erdős and Hans Heilbronn in 1964 states that $|2^\wedge A| \ge \min\{p,\, 2|A|-3\}$ if p is a prime and A is a nonempty subset of the field Z/pZ. This was first confirmed by J. A. Dias da Silva and Y. O. Hamidoune in 1994 who showed that

$$|n^\wedge A| \ge \min\{p(F),\ n|A|-n^2+1\},$$

where A is a finite nonempty subset of a field F, and p(F) is a prime p if F is of characteristic p, and p(F) = ∞ if F is of characteristic 0. Various extensions of this result were given by Noga Alon, M. B. Nathanson and I. Ruzsa in 1996, Q. H. Hou and Zhi-Wei Sun in 2002, and G. Karolyi in 2004.

== Combinatorial Nullstellensatz ==
A tool in the study of lower bounds for cardinalities of various restricted sumsets is the following principle: the combinatorial Nullstellensatz. Let $f(x_1,\ldots,x_n)$ be a polynomial over a field $F$. Suppose that the coefficient of the monomial $x_1^{k_1}\cdots x_n^{k_n}$ in $f(x_1,\ldots,x_n)$ is nonzero and $k_1+\cdots+k_n$ is the total degree of $f(x_1,\ldots,x_n)$. If $A_1,\ldots,A_n$ are finite subsets of $F$ with $|A_i|>k_i$ for $i=1,\ldots,n$, then there are $a_1\in A_1,\ldots,a_n\in A_n$ such that $f(a_1,\ldots,a_n) \neq 0$.

This result was rooted in a paper of N. Alon and M. Tarsi in 1989, and developed by Alon, Nathanson and Ruzsa in 1995–1996, and reformulated by Alon in 1999.

== See also ==
- Polynomial method in combinatorics
