= Tami Steinmetz Center for Peace Research =

Tami Steinmetz Center For Peace Research was an academic research institution of Tel Aviv University was founded in 1992 and closed down in 2020 as the subject of peace was considered no longer relevant. The center was funded by Daniela and Daniel Steinmetz, who established it in memory of their daughter. It surveyed public opinion regarding the Israeli–Palestinian peace process, the Israeli–Palestinian conflict, and the Arab–Israeli conflict.

The center published monthly surveys about the current state of public opinion. It was most famous for the "Peace Index", a numerical measure of Israeli public support for the peace process. The Peace Index was divided into 4 sub-indices:

1. General Peace Index
2. Oslo Index
3. Syrian Index
4. Negotiation Index

Each index was computed according to the number and percent of supporters for each peace negotiation and the number of people believing that the negotiation will actually achieve peace.

== See also ==
- Al Mezan Center for Human Rights
- American Israel Public Affairs Committee
- Amnesty International
- Human Rights Watch
- Madrid Conference of 1991
- Oslo Accords (1993)
- Israel–Jordan peace treaty (1994)
- Camp David 2000 Summit
- Projects working for peace among Israelis and Arabs
- List of Middle East peace proposals
- International law and the Arab–Israeli conflict
